= Transcendental Meditation in education =

Application of Transcendental Meditation technique in education

Transcendental Meditation in education (also known as Consciousness-Based Education) is the application of the Transcendental Meditation technique in an educational setting or institution. These educational programs and institutions have been founded in the US, United Kingdom, Australia, India, Africa and Japan. The Transcendental Meditation technique became popular with students in the 1960s and by the early 1970s centers for the Students International Meditation Society were established at a thousand campuses in the US with similar growth occurring in Germany, Canada and Britain. The Maharishi International University was established in 1973 in the US and began offering accredited, degree programs. In 1977 courses in Transcendental Meditation and the Science of Creative Intelligence (SCI) were legally prohibited from New Jersey (USA) public high schools on religious grounds by virtue of the Establishment Clause of the First Amendment. This "dismantled" the TM program's use of government funding in U.S. public schools "but did not constitute a negative evaluation of the program itself". Since 1979, schools that incorporate the Transcendental Meditation technique using private, non-governmental funding have been reported in the US, South America, Southeast Asia, Northern Ireland, South Africa and Israel.

A number of educational institutions have been founded by Maharishi Mahesh Yogi, the Transcendental Meditation movement and its supporters. These institutions include several schools offering public and private secondary education in the Maharishi School of the Age of Enlightenment (USA), Maharishi School (England) the Maharishi International School (Switzerland), Maharishi School, (Australia), South Africa (Maharishi Invincibility School of Management), and a network of Maharishi Vidya Mandir Schools (India). Likewise, Maharishi colleges and universities have been established including Maharishi European Research University (Netherlands), Maharishi Institute of Management (India), Maharishi University of Management and Technology (India), Maharishi Institute (South Africa) and Maharishi Mahesh Yogi Vedic University (India). In the US, critics have called Transcendental Meditation a revised form of Eastern, religious philosophy and opposed its use in public schools while a member of the Pacific Justice Institute says practicing Transcendental Meditation in public schools with private funding is constitutional.

== History of school programs ==
=== 1965 to 1979 ===
The Students' International Meditation Society (SIMS) incorporated in 1965/1966 and focused on offering the TM technique to students and faculty at schools and universities. The UCLA (University of California, Los Angeles) chapter had 1,000 members and was co-founded by researcher and physiologist, Robert Keith Wallace, the first president of Maharishi International University. By 1974, 14 states had encouraged local schools to teach TM in the classroom, and it was taught at 50 universities. Among the public school systems where TM was taught were Shawnee Mission, Kansas, Maplewood, Paterson, Union Hill and West New York, New Jersey, Eastchester, New York and Toronto, Ontario. The organization was described as a "phenomenal success" and continues to function in some countries including the U.S.A. A 33-lesson video course called the Science of Creative Intelligence was offered at universities such as Stanford, Yale, the University of Colorado, the University of Wisconsin, and Oregon State University.

In 1979, the Third Circuit Court of Appeals affirmed the 1977 decision of the US District Court of New Jersey that a course in Transcendental Meditation and the Science of Creative Intelligence (SCI) was religious activity within the meaning of the Establishment Clause of the First Amendment and that the government funded teaching of SCI/TM in the New Jersey public high schools was prohibited. The court ruled that, although SCI/TM is not a theistic religion, it deals with issues of ultimate concern, truth, and other ideas analogous to those in well-recognized religions. The court found that the religious nature of the course was clear from careful examination of the textbook, the expert testimony elicited, and the uncontested facts concerning the puja ceremony, which it found involved "offerings to deities as part of a regularly scheduled course in the schools' educational programs". State action was involved because the SCI/TM course and activities involved the teaching of a religion, without an objective secular purpose. According to religious scholar Cynthia Ann Humes the Malnak decision "dismantled" the TM program's use of government funding to incorporate Transcendental Meditation into public schools. However, according to religious scholars Douglas E. Cowan and David G. Bromley this "judicial rebuff" of the New Jersey school project did not render "a negative evaluation of the program itself" and those who oppose the practice in public schools are said to be mainly conservative Christians and civil libertarians who seek to preserve church-state separation.

=== 1980 to 1999 ===
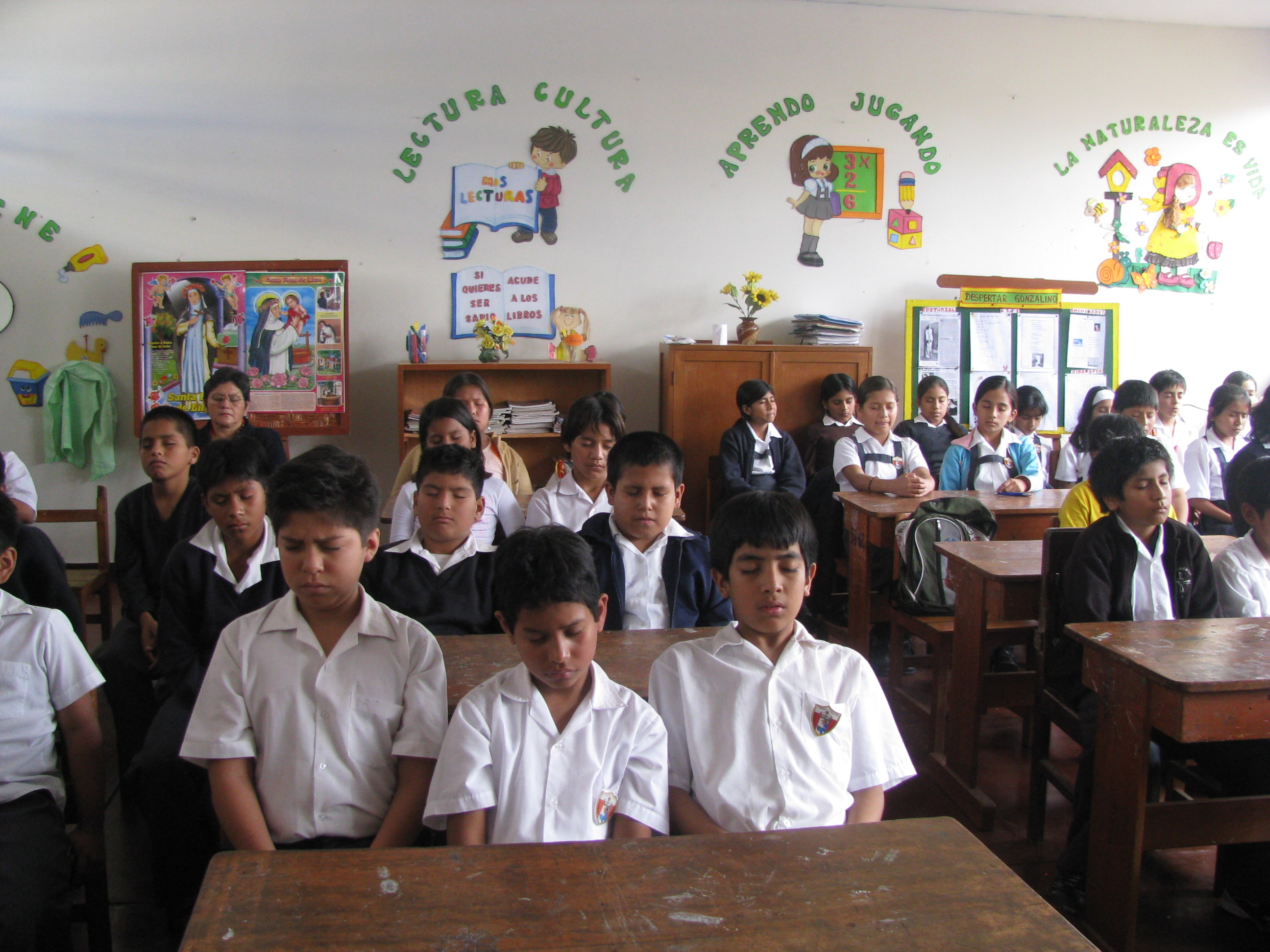
Students in a Peru classroom practicing the TM technique

Since 1979, schools and universities in the U.S. and abroad have introduced the Transcendental Meditation technique using private, non-governmental funding. The technique has been introduced on a voluntary basis, with parental consent, and teachers and parents are taught the meditation before the students learn. Often referred to as the Quiet Time Program, the students and teachers meditate for 10 to 20 minutes twice per day. The program consists of TM instruction and follow-up, as well as training of school faculty and staff to supervise the TM sessions offered at the school.

The Fletcher Johnson Educational Center, a charter school with 1,500 students in Washington, D.C., introduced the TM program for schools in 1994. Its principal, George H. Rutherford, is a member of the DLF's Board of Advisors. The Ideal Academy Public Charter School began its program with the approval of the Washington, D.C. Board of Education in 1997. The 2005–2006 pilot project at Ideal Academy was conducted along with research to document the effects of the program. The Nataki Talibah Schoolhouse] in Detroit began using the program for students in the fifth through eighth grade in 1996 and was featured on the Today Show in 2003. The school has since been classified by the Skillman Foundation as a "High-Performing Middle School". Over the years, the program at Nitaki Talibah has been funded by various foundations including General Motors, Daimler Chrysler, the Liebler Foundation and the DLF. The program at the school has been researched by Rita Benn of the University of Michigan's Complementary and Alternative Medicine Research Center.

=== 2000 to present ===
The Chelsea School, a private school in of Silver Spring, Maryland, offers the program to its fifth through twelfth graders who have attention deficit and hyperactivity disorders (ADHD). The program was part of a three-month pilot study conducted by William R. Stixrud, a clinical neuropsychologist and health advisor for the TM's Committee for Stress-Free Schools. The New York Times reported in 2005 that American University, in Washington D.C., was set to begin offering Transcendental Meditation classes as part of a research project to measure its potential effect on "grades, IQ's and mental health". Later, the practice of the technique by 250 students at American University, Georgetown University and Howard University in the Washington D.C. area was monitored as part of a research study conducted by American University and Maharishi University of Management.

In 2004, the New York Committee for Stress-Free Schools held a press conference in New York City. The conference included testimony from students, educators and scientists who support the use of TM in the school setting. The following year the TM technique was taught to "more than 100 administrators, teachers and students" and over the next five years, 300 additional high school students learned the technique. According to the DLF web site, the TM program was introduced to the Arts and Technology Academy at Weaver High School in Hartford CT in 2006. Four hundred and fifty students as well as principals and administrators are reported to have been instructed in the technique. A voluntary program at the Kingsbury School, a Washington D.C. private school "for students with learning disorders" in grades K-12, was featured on the PBS program, To The Contrary in 2007. According to the school director, about 10 percent of the teachers, parents and students declined to participate because they found it be religious and cult-ish. Conferences sponsored by the New England Committee for Stress-Free Schools were held in Providence, Rhode Island; Fairfield, Connecticut; and Boston, Massachusetts in 2005. The Boston conference was attended by 100 teachers and featured testimony from school principals who have experience with the TM program in schools. In the mid-2000s the TM technique was incorporated into the educational program at the Daburiya High School in Israel.

The David Lynch Foundation for Consciousness-Based Education and World Peace (DLF) was founded in 2004 and has provided funding for Transcendental Meditation instruction in many educational settings. According to the DLF, it has funded school programs in New York City, Brazil, Peru, Bolivia, Vietnam, Nepal, Northern Ireland, Ghana, Kenya, Uganda, South Africa and Israel.

In 2006, six public schools were each awarded $25,000 to begin a TM program and a total of twenty five public, private, and charter schools in the United States had offered Transcendental Meditation to their students. In 2006, the Terra Linda High School in San Rafael, California canceled plans for Transcendental Meditation classes due to concerns of parents that it would be promoting religion. In the San Francisco area there are three schools that offer the technique as part of their school program, funded primarily by the David Lynch Foundation. The Visitacion Valley Middle School began the program in 2007 and the Everett Middle School and John O'Connell High School began the program sometime after that. The Maharishi Institute, an African university, was founded in 2007 and uses the Transcendental Meditation technique in its programs.

As of 2008, the David Lynch Foundation had funded TM instruction for "more than 2,000 students, teachers and parents" at "21 U.S. schools and universities", in addition to substantially higher numbers of instruction at schools outside the U.S. Programs have been conducted in Washington D.C., Hartford CT, San Francisco CA, Detroit MI, Steamboat Springs CO, Tucson AZ, Los Angeles CA and Chicago IL. One of those programs was the Lowell Whiteman Primary School in Steamboat Springs, Colorado which implemented a two-year trial program using Transcendental Meditation in their classrooms. The program was used with fifth through eighth graders. After instruction, the TM teachers visit the school once per month to assess the students' progress and their meditation technique. The following year, about 160 students and teachers at Tucson Magnet High School in Tucson AZ, took the training in Transcendental Meditation and meditate daily for 15 minutes before or after school.

In 2010, the women's squash team at Trinity College in Hartford, CT began practicing the TM technique together after every practice. In 2011 music mogul Russell Simmons announced plans to provide financial support to the David Lynch Foundation to teach TM at Hillhouse High School in New Haven, Connecticut. The TM technique was taught to students at Norwich University, a private military academy, as part of a long-term study on meditation and military performance.

== TM schools and universities ==
Consciousness-Based Education (CBE) refers to the educational approach that is utilized at schools and universities founded by Maharishi Mahesh Yogi.

=== United States ===
Maharishi University of Management (MUM), formerly known as Maharishi International University, was founded in 1973. The campus is located in Fairfield, Iowa, United States. The university is not-for-profit, is accredited through the Ph.D. level by The Higher Learning Commission of the North Central Association of Colleges and Schools, and offers a Consciousness-Based Education approach that includes the practice of the Transcendental Meditation technique. Degree programs are offered in the arts, sciences, business, and the humanities.

Maharishi School of the Age of Enlightenment (MSAE), located on the MUM campus, is an independent, non-denominational, college preparatory school located in Fairfield, Iowa. The school has an open admissions policy and its curriculum includes the practice of the Transcendental Meditation technique. The Ideal Girls School was a single-gender college preparatory boarding school in Maharishi Vedic City, Iowa. According to its website, the school was originally chartered in New York in 1996, then set up its campus in North Carolina in 1998, before finally moving to Iowa in 2001 where it received state accreditation in 2003.

Maharishi International University College of Natural Law was located in Washington D.C. five blocks from the White House. From 1981 to 1987 this was also the location of the TM movement's "administrative headquarters" for North America as well as a national organization of 6,000 American medical doctors who practiced TM, a private school, a clinic, and a TM meditation center. In 1991, the Washington Post reported that the Maharishi, referring to Washington DC, had advised TM practitioners: "save yourself from the criminal atmosphere". As a result, 20 to 40 TM practitioners put their homes up for sale in an effort to move away from the city.

In 2007 the GCWP announced a plan to build a Maharishi Central University campus at "the geographical center of the Lower 48 states" in Kansas. The facility was under construction until early 2008, when, according to founding president John Hagelin, the necessary $100 million in construction funds was not readily available during the Great Recession. As of April 2010 one building was near completion while the other 10 buildings were still under construction. In 2009 an all boys, boarding school, called the Maharishi Academy of Total Knowledge, was founded in Antrim, New Hampshire with "just a handful of students".

==== USA Reception ====
University of South Carolina sociologist Barry Markovsky described the TM technique in schools as "stealth religion", and Barry W. Lynn, executive director of Americans United for Separation of Church and State, says Transcendental Meditation is rooted in Hinduism and crosses the same constitutional line as in the Malnak case and decision of 1979. Since then, however, "TM has made a comeback of sorts with some governmental sponsorship" according to authors Forsthoefel and Humes. In May 2008, Lynn said that the Americans United for Separation of Church and State was keeping "a close legal eye on the TM movement" and "there are no imminent cases" against the movement. At the same time, Brad Dacus of the Pacific Justice Institute says doing Transcendental Meditation during a school's "quiet time" (a short period of school time for private prayer or relaxation) "is constitutional."

According to a 2008 Newsweek article, there is a "growing movement to bring Transcendental Meditation... into more U.S. schools as a stress-buster for America's overwhelmed kids". At the same time, critics say that Transcendental Meditation is a revised form of Eastern, religious philosophy, and they oppose its use in public schools. Some parents and critics view it as an overstepping of boundaries that could lead to "lifelong personal and financial servitude to a corporation run by Maharishi Mahesh Yogi". At the same time, many parents feel the meditation has created "profound results" for their children, and that they "hardly view TM as exclusively, or even overtly, religious," and advocates describe it is a physiological technique that calms the mind, improves grades and attention span, while reducing disruptive behavior. A 2011 research review said their "findings provide good support for the use of TM to enhance several forms of information processing in students".

=== Europe ===
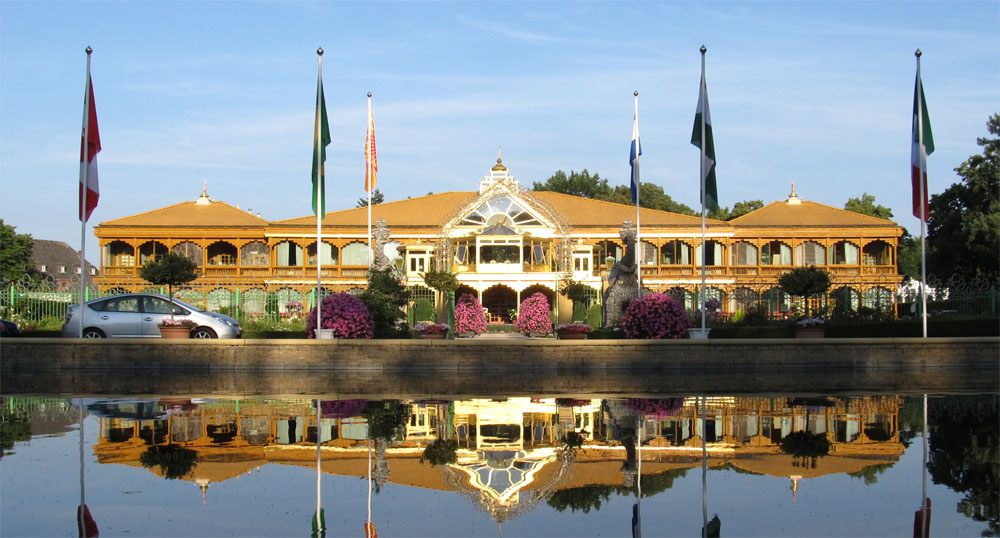
MERU branch campus in Vlodrop, the Netherlands

Maharishi European Research University (MERU) was founded by Maharishi Mahesh Yogi in Seelisberg, Switzerland in 1975. The university's purpose is to conduct research into the effects of Transcendental Meditation and higher states of consciousness. The original campus was located in a Victorian-era hotel above Lake Lucerne. The first chancellor was physicist Larry Domash. David Orme Johnson was the vice-chancellor. Institutions bearing the MERU name have also operated at Mentmore Towers, an estate in Buckinghamshire, England, and at Vlodrop, Netherlands. Notable alumni include Bevan Morris, Ashley Deans, Mike Tompkins, and a few sources say John Gray was a MERU graduate. The Maharishi Foundation purchased the Kolleg St. Ludwig campus in 1984 for US$900,000 and it became the MERU university campus.

The Maharishi School in Skelmersdale, Lancashire, England is the only specialist TM school in the country and has 100 pupils aged between four and 16. At Limeside Primary in Oldham, half of the teaching staff now regularly meditate. In September 2011, the Maharishi School became one of 24 independent schools in the country to be awarded full state funding as part of the government Free Schools initiative. In 1982 the Maharishi University of Natural Law for England was established. Another Maharishi School of the Age of Enlightenment is located in Wheaton, Maryland, USA, and a single gender, secondary school called Maharishi International School is located in Zurich, Switzerland.

=== India ===
Maharishi Shiksha Sansthan (MSS) is a registered society that oversees Maharishi Vidya Mandir Schools (MVMS) and Maharishi Ideal Girls Schools located across India. MSS also administrates the five campuses of the Maharishi Institute of Management and the Maharishi University of Management and Technology campus.

The Maharishi Vidya Mandir Schools were founded by Maharishi Mahesh Yogi in 1995. MVMS is affiliated with the New Delhi Central Board of Secondary Education (CBSE) and/or their respective state-school, education boards. Maharishi Vidya Mandir Schools include 148 branches in 118 cities with a total of 90,000 to 100,000 students and 5,500 teaching and support staff.

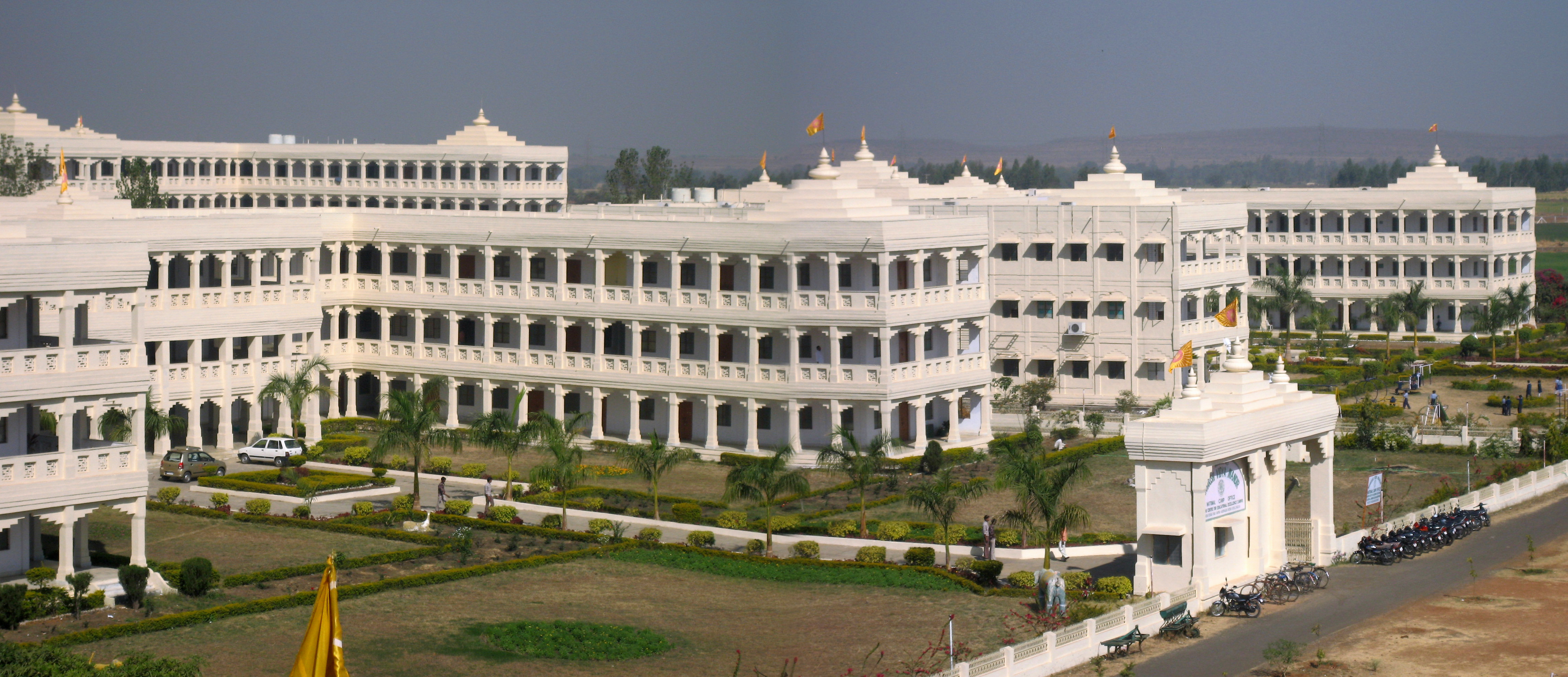
Maharishi Centre for Educational Excellence, Bhopal, India.

The Maharishi Institute of Management has campuses in Bangalore, Bhopal, Hyderabad, Indore, Chennai and Maharishi Nagar (Delhi). The institute was established in India in 1995 and offers several degrees including MBA, PGDBA, MCA, BCA and BBA. The institute describes its purpose as the elimination of "existing problems in the field of management in all areas of human concern by establishing automation in administration – management supported by the total intelligence of Natural Law." The Bangalore campus is reported to be an "important centre for computer training and hi-tech learning" in India.

Maharishi Mahesh Yogi Vedic University, also known as Maharishi Mahesh Yogi Vedic Vishwavidyalaya (MMYVV), is a public university located in Katni, Madhya Pradesh. Maharishi University of Management and Technology, with campuses in Bilaspur and Chhattisgarh, is a private University recognised by the University Grants Commission (UGC). The Maharishi Center for Educational Excellence (MCEE) was established in 1999 by its chairman, Girish Chandra Verma.

The Maharishi College of Natural Law was established in Orissa India in 1982 and was supported by donations from Maharishi Institute of Creative Intelligence (MICI). In addition to the standard curriculum, the college offers courses in Transcendental Meditation and the Science of Creative intelligence. The college began as a school for boys with 384 students and 17 teachers. The college is recognised by the Government of Orissa and is affiliated with the Council of Higher Secondary Education since 1983.

The Cosmic Business School was founded in 2004, "based on the principles of Maharishi Mahesh Yogi"and according to the school, many of its graduates are placed with a company within the "Maharishi Group of Industries".

=== Africa ===
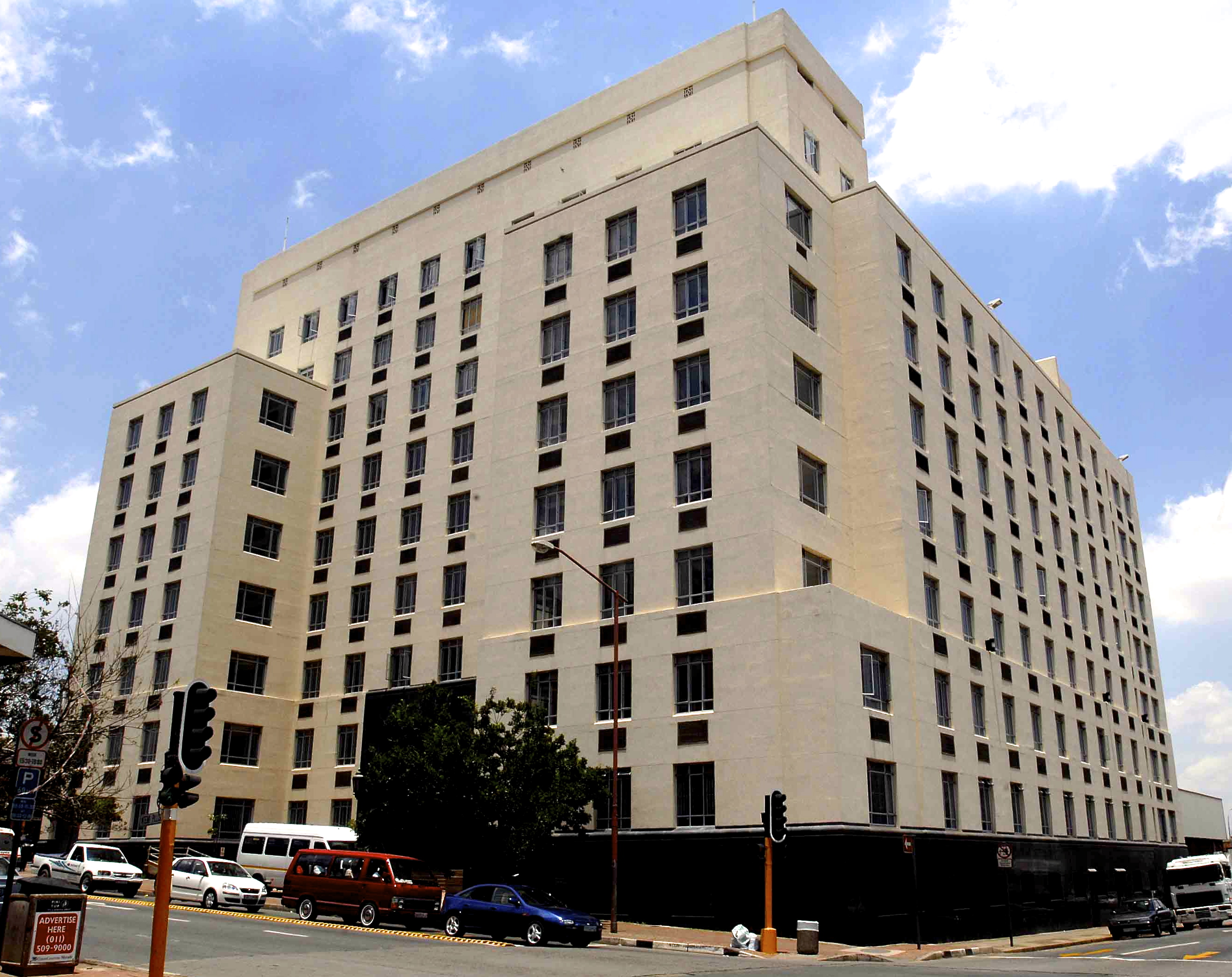
Maharishi Invincibility Institute in Johannesburg, South Africa.

The Maharishi Institute, founded in 2007, under South Africa's Community & Individual Development Association, provides tertiary education utilizing Transcendental Meditation and the Consciousness-Based educational approach. It aims at creating economically self-sufficient institutions that provide large scale, affordable education for students from Grades 11 through the master's degree level. It was visited by Russell Simmons a year later and is located in the business district of Johannesburg. Its goal is to provide disadvantaged students with an "accelerated holistic education" that includes employment at "an in-house call centre" and other university positions during their course of study. The goal of the work/study program is to allow the institution to become self funded. Initial funding and grants for the institute were provided by Educating Africa foundation. It was established by the founders of CIDA City Campus with the goal of further addressing the issue of "accessible tertiary education" by utilizing Consciousness-Based education methods. The Maharishi Institute's goal is to set a precedent for the field of higher education that could be replicated in other African cities.

According to a press release, in 2010, at a global educational summit in Bahrain, the institute was granted an award that recognized it as an innovative institution with the potential to significantly improve educational outcomes through adaptable and replicable business models. The web site for Consciousness-Based Education, South Africa lists 12 partner schools in the US, Netherlands, Australia, India, Ecuador, Thailand, China, and Great Britain and says that "Consciousness-Based Education has been introduced into more than 230 schools and more than 25 universities or other tertiary institutions worldwide". A Maharishi Secondary School for Girls is located in Mbale, Uganda.

=== Australia and Japan ===
There is a Maharishi School near Melbourne, Australia and a Maharishi Research Institute in Japan.

== Sources ==
- Williamson (2010)
