= Maharishi School =

Maharishi School may refer to these institutions related to Indian religious teacher Maharishi Mahesh Yogi:

- Maharishi School, Lancashire, a secondary school in Lancashire, England
- Maharishi School (US), a college preparatory school in Iowa, United States
- Maharishi School of Management, former name of Maharishi International University
