= Claire Hoffman =

American journalist (born 1977)

- Born: Claire Denise Hoffman; March 5, 1977 (age 49); Iowa City, Iowa, U.S.
- Education: Maharishi School of the Age of Enlightenment; University of Chicago Divinity School; Columbia School of Journalism
- Occupations: Journalist; author
- Website: www.clairehoffman.com

Claire Denise Hoffman (born March 5, 1977) is an American journalist, author, and assistant professor of journalism at the University of California, Riverside.

== Biography ==
Claire Denise Hoffman was born in Iowa City, Iowa, March 5, 1977. From kindergarten through high school was raised in Fairfield, Iowa, where her divorced mother was part of the Transcendental Meditation movement. She attended Maharishi School of the Age of Enlightenment. She has a master's degree in Religious Studies from the University of Chicago Divinity School and a master's degree from the Columbia School of Journalism.

While working for the Los Angeles Times, she profiled the founder of Girls Gone Wild, Joe Francis, in a story titled “Baby Give Me a Kiss”. The piece recounts Francis' battery upon Hoffman as well as his alleged rape of an 18-year-old girl. The story is the most viewed piece on latimes.com.

She writes and has written for numerous publications including Rolling Stone, The New Yorker, Condé Nast Portfolio and the Los Angeles Times.

In 2016 she published her first book, Greetings from Utopia Park: Surviving a Transcendent Childhood, a memoir based on her experiences growing up in the Transcendental Meditation movement in Fairfield, Iowa. Her second book, Sister, Sinner: The Miraculous Life and Mysterious Disappearance of Aimee Semple McPherson, was published in 2025.
