= List of educational institutions in Katni =

== Universities ==
- Maharishi Mahesh Yogi Vedic University

== Schools ==
- H.D Memorial Higher Secondary School, Katni
- KCS girls school katni, Katni
- St. Paul's Senior Secondary School, Katni
- Sadhuram school Katni, Katni
- Saraswati higher secondary school, Katni
- Syna International School, Katni
- Jawahar Navodaya Vidyalaya, Badwara District. Katni (M. P.)
- JPV DAV Public School, Katni
- Maharishi Vidya Mandir, Dubey Colony, Katni
- Bardsley Higher Secondary School, Katni
- Delhi Public School, Katni
- Kids Care Higher Secondary School, Katni
- Wisdom World English Medium School, Katni, Barhi road
