= Maharishi Institute of Management =

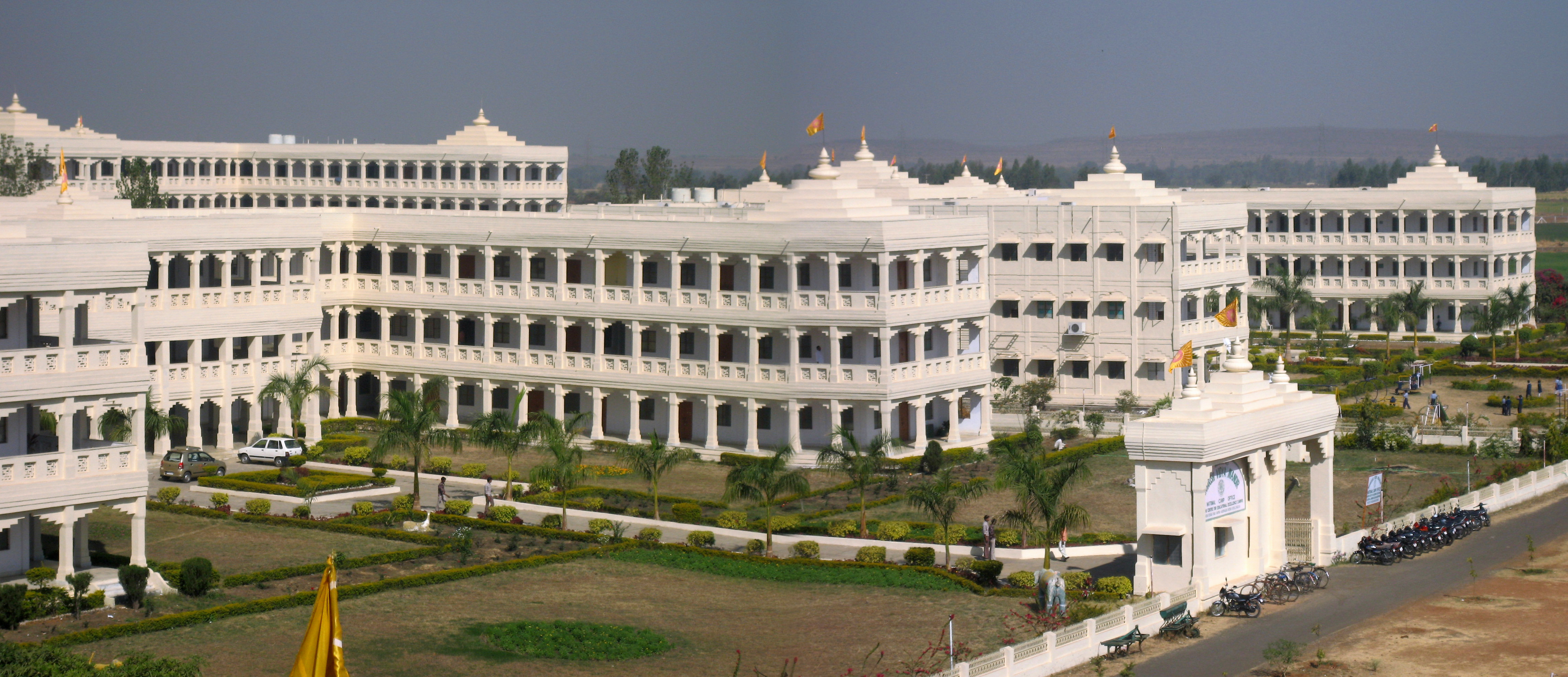
Maharishi Institute of Management Maharishi Institute of Management - Bhopal
- Type: Private
- Established: 1993
- Affiliations: Universities and AICTE
- President: Brahmachari Girish Chandra Varma
- Location: Bhopal, Indore, Noida, Bangalore, Hyderabad and Chennai, India
- Website: http://www.maharishiinstituteofmanagement.com

Maharishi Institute of Management (MIM) is a group of private institutes founded by Maharishi Mahesh Yogi with locations in Maharishi Nagar(NOIDA), Bhopal, Indore, Hyderabad, Bengaluru and Chennai, India. The Institute is accredited by the All India Council for Technical Education (AICTE) and offers Graduate and Post Graduate courses in Management and Computer Science. Maharishi Institute of Management is a part of Maharishi Mahesh Yogi's global education movement. MIM is established under the auspices of Maharishi Shiksha Sansthan (MSS).

== Accreditation ==
The Institute was established under the auspices of Maharishi Shiksha Sansthan, a Registered Society under the Societies Registration Act XXI of 1860. The Institute is accredited by different state universities in their respective locations and the All India Council for Technical Education (AICTE) to offer Graduate and Post Graduate courses in Management and Computer Science. The MIM Indore campus offers BBA, BCA, MBA and MCA in affiliation to Maharishi Mahesh Yogi Vedic Vishwavidyalaya Jabalpur. The Post-Graduate Diploma in Business Management programme offered at MIM Maharishi Nagar Noida campus is approved by the All India Council for Technical Education. BBA, BCA, MBA and MCA offered at MIM Bhopal campus are affiliated to Barkatullah University Bhopal and approved by the All India Council for Technical Education. BBA, BCA and B.Com courses offered at MIM Bengaluru are affiliated to Bangalore University and approved by the AICTE. BBA and MBA courses offered at MIM Chennai are affiliated to Madurai Kamaraj University.

== Mission ==
The mission of Maharishi Institute of Management is to create problem-free management in India through management based on Natural Law, so that India can successfully meet the challenges of the globalized economy, maintain cultural integrity, and rise to leadership in the family of nations. The management training at MIM accomplishes these goals by providing not only "career-oriented" education, but also "life-oriented" education through a Consciousness-Based Education system.

== Student life ==
MIM incorporates the principles and programmes of Maharishi's Consciousness-Based Education, including the Transcendental Meditation and TM-Sidhi programme. Students also get in-depth exposure to Maharishi's Vedic Management. The basis of this approach is the use of Maharishi's Vedic Science and Technology to develop the consciousness of every student. MIM courses aim to be "job-oriented", "life-oriented" and "life-supporting".

== Campuses ==
The Institute has established a national coordinating office in New Delhi, and six campuses at: Bengaluru, Bhopal, Chennai, Hyderabad, Indore, Noida.

== Courses ==
Maharishi Institute of Management offers the following courses:

MIM Bengaluru

- Bachelor of Business Management [BBM]
- Bachelor of Computer Applications [BCA]
- Bachelor of Commerce [B.Com.]
- Bachelor of Arts[B.A]

MIM Bhopal

- Bachelor of Business Administration [BBA]
- Bachelor of Computer Applications [BCA]
- Bachelor of Education [B.Ed.]
- Bachelor of Physical Education [B.PEd.]
- Master of Business Administration [MBA]
- Master of Computer Applications [MCA]

MIM Hyderabad

- Bachelor of Business Administration [BBA]
- Master of Business Administration [MBA]

MIM Chennai

- Master of Business Administration [MBA]

MIM Indore

- Bachelor of Business Administration [BBA]
- Bachelor of Computer Applications [BCA]
- Master of Business Administration [MBA]
- Master of Computer Applications [MCA]

MIM NOIDA (Maharishi Nagar)

- Post Graduate Diploma in Management [PGDBM] (AICTE Approved)
