= Picasso Animation College =

Animation college in Delhi, India

Coordinates: 28.5684°N 77.2184°E

Picasso Animation College is an animation college in India headquartered in Delhi, India. It runs in collaboration with Centennial College, Canada.

== About ==
Picasso Animation College, headquartered in New Delhi, provides education in digital animation in conjunction with Toronto's Centennial College. Picasso Animation College held its first convocation at its Hyderabad campus in 2010, hosted by its director general, O. P. Sharma. There used to be a full-credit, 10-month program of Digital Animation (with an optional Art Design Fundamentals electoral the year before) with Centennial providing industry-trained instructors, including Philip Edward Alexy. However, as of 1 December 2011, Centennial now only offers a minor non-credit Adult Educational certification in Picasso's STAR program.

== See also ==
- Indian animation industry
- Film and Television Institute of India
- State Institute of Film and Television
- Government Film and Television Institute
- Satyajit Ray Film and Television Institute
