= Pacific Justice Institute =

American conservative legal organization

- Founded: 1997
- Founder: Brad W. Dacus
- Type: Legal advocacy
- Location: Sacramento, California
- President: Brad W. Dacus
- Website: www.pacificjustice.org

Pacific Justice Institute (PJI) is a conservative Christian legal organization in the United States that focuses on religious freedom, parental rights, and related civil liberties. Founded in 1997 by Brad W. Dacus, PJI provides free legal representation and advocacy primarily for clients seeking to protect religious expression and parental rights in education and public policy.

== History ==
Pacific Justice Institute was established in 1997 by Brad W. Dacus. Since its founding, PJI has grown to include multiple regional offices and has been involved in numerous legal cases across the United States.

== Structure and finances ==
Pacific Justice Institute operates regional offices across several states, with a central headquarters in California. Brad W. Dacus has served as president since its inception. The organization is funded primarily through private donations, including contributions from individuals and faith-based groups. Detailed financial information is available through IRS filings as a nonprofit organization.

== Positions and activities ==
PJI has been involved in legislation, has filed amicus curiae briefs in legal cases and testified in state and federal legislatures.

PJI supported Proposition 8, a 2008 California ballot initiative that defined marriage as one man and one woman. The ballot initiative was overturned by the Hollingsworth v. Perry decision in 2013.

PJI opposed the Affordable Care Act's individual mandate provision.

PJI unsuccessfully opposed SB 1172, a 2012 California law that banned conversion therapy for children under 18.

PJI opposed the School Success and Opportunity Act, a 2013 California law which allows transgender public school students to use restrooms and play on sports teams that fit their gender identity. In 2013, Media Matters for America described the Pacific Justice Institute as the "LGBT Misinformer of The Year", because it had publicized a press release containing false claims against a transgender student that were based only on the complaints of an angry parent, as part of its campaign against the law. Media Matters stated that PJI "came pretty close to conceding" the story was not true. In 2014, PJI filed suit over whether a referendum against the law qualified for the November 2014 ballot.

PJI helped a neighborhood group successfully oppose the operating permit for a medical marijuana dispensary, in the only neighborhood in San Francisco without a local dispensary.

PJI represented a church that objected to a nightclub with "adult entertainment" locating next door. During the COVID-19 pandemic, PJI challenged public health restrictions on Church gatherings.

PJI represented a student who was suspended for distributing religious literature on public school grounds.

PJI represented people who had large Bible studies gatherings in a private home without a permit.

In 2019, PJI advocated against a California sex education law that required public schools to teach comprehensive sexual health education and HIV prevention education (while allowing parents to opt their children out).

In 2020, PJI filed a lawsuit against Washington Gov. Jay Inslee on behalf of two churches over the reopening process during the COVID-19 pandemic. Gov. Inslee relaxed the attendance restrictions after a federal appeals court sided with a church in a lawsuit in Nevada.

== Litigation ==
Hartman v. Santa Clara County – PJI represented a doctor and a radiation therapist who objected to their employer's vaccine mandate. Both plaintiffs have religious objections to taking the shot for COVID-19.

Snatchko v. Galleria Mall – Youth pastor Matthew Snatchko was arrested at the Roseville Galleria Mall in 2007 for striking up a casual conversation with two other shoppers about faith. Although Snatchko had the shoppers' permission to broach the subject, a store employee called mall security guards, who arrested Snatchko. Criminal charges were dropped, but attorneys with PJI filed suit challenging the mall's restrictions on conversations between strangers. The trial court ruled in favor of the mall, but the Court of Appeal reversed, in a unanimous opinion, finding no legitimate basis for suppression of the youth pastor's speech.

Bible Club and R.G., a Minor by and through her Next Friend R.G. v. Placentia-Yorba Linda Unified School Dist., 573 F.Supp.2d 1291 (2008) – A federal court issued a preliminary injunction against a school district that refused to allow a high school student to start a Christian club at her school. The school only permitted "curriculum-related" groups to form on campus. The District settled after the court ruled that the club must be given equal access to meet, use school supplies, have an advisor, and a yearbook listing.

Guaytay v. San Diego County – PJI represented a couple in San Juan Capistrano, California against the city when city officials fined them $300 for holding regular Bible studies at their home, claiming the meetings violated the city's zoning laws. After PJI filed a lawsuit, the city changed its municipal code to not discriminate against religious gatherings by requiring costly use permits.

Codding v. Placer Co. Clerk –After the California Supreme Court found the ban on same-sex marriage unconstitutional, but before the passage of Proposition 8, the State of California changed the words on the marriage license form from Bride and Groom to Party A and Party B. A man and a woman applied for a license and added the words Bride and Groom next to Party A and Party B. After the couple was married, the officiating minister signed and mailed marriage certificate to the county clerk, who rejected it because of the interlineation. PJI filed a lawsuit on behalf of the couple, and after the case was reported in the press, poll numbers supporting the Proposition rose from 38% to 47%. The case was settled after the State of California agreed to change the wording on the license to remove Party A and Party B and allow checkboxes for options including Bride and Groom.

K.D. v. GUHSD – A high school student shared his faith in private conversations with other students, but was warned by a teacher to stop because of the separation of church and state. A teacher also warned him not to take his Bible to school, and confiscated it. The student was suspended for two days. The suspension notice stated: "Student was told to stop preaching at school. Student continued after being warned several times." The teacher also wrote on the suspension form, "Student will not bring Bible to school." The suit was brought in federal court, in the Southern District of California. The school district settled the case.

Murrieta Red-light case – There was an effort to repeal a law in Murrieta, California that mandated that all traffic lights be installed with cameras in order to catch the license plates of people who blew red-lights and the effort to repeal the law came in the form of a private petition in order to put it on the ballot for the next election. However, a lawsuit was levied against the private petition claiming that "residents don't have the authority to change traffic laws, and thus remove the cameras." PJI represented the petitioners in court. A committee funded by companies that provided the traffic cameras filed suit. On April 5, 2013, a Riverside Superior Court judge struck down the voter-approved ban.

== See also ==
- Religious Freedom Restoration Act
- Alliance Defending Freedom
- Liberty Counsel
