= Maharishi School, Lancashire =

Maharishi School

Location
- Lathom, Skelmersdale, Lancashire, L40 6JJ; England; 53.5703°N 2.78241°W

Information
- Type: Free school
- Motto: A school with a difference
- Religious affiliation: Non-denominational
- Established: 1986
- Department for Education URN: 137498 Tables
- Ofsted: Reports
- Headteacher: Lisa Edwards
- Gender: Co-educational
- Age: 4 to 16
- Enrolment: 212
- Capacity: 216
- Website: http://www.maharishischool.com/

The Maharishi School, ("Maharishi Free School or Maharishi School of the Age of Enlightenment") is a non-academically selective free school in Skelmersdale and Lathom, Lancashire, UK. The school was founded in 1986 and uses "consciousness-based education" methods including Transcendental Meditation.

== Description ==
The school takes its name from Maharishi Mahesh Yogi and uses an educational approach called "Consciousness-based Education". Its students learn the Transcendental Meditation technique (TM) and practice it in 10-minute sessions, twice during the school day Students also learn the principles of the "Science of Creative Intelligence" such as "order is present everywhere" and "the nature of life is to grow" which are said to allow the students to appreciate broader values of life and then apply them in their daily life. According to school officials, the program enables the students to be calmer, more focused as well as relaxed and improves their ability to learn. A 1998 report by National Public Radio said the school has been ranked in the top two percent of the country's schools for the past 12 years. In 2002, the Liverpool Daily Post reported that the school had a 100% pass rate on GCSE tests in seven out of the prior 8 years. In 2011, a spokesman for the Department for Education said the Maharishi School was "outstanding in almost all categories" and that the school "has a strong record of high academic achievement". He cited an Ofsted report which states that the school provides an "outstanding education" and, according to the school's web site, Ofsted reports its GCSE scores to be in the country's top 2.5%. The school is reported to be located "in the top 20 per cent of England's most wealthy areas". Schools with similar curriculum include the Maharishi School of the Age of Enlightenment in the Fairfield, Iowa U.S. and the Maharishi School in Reservoir, Australia.

== History ==
The school was founded in 1986 as an independent, fee-based school with 14 pupils. As of July 2021, the school had 212 pupils and a capacity of 216.

In 2011, it was one of 24 schools that applied for and received government funding as a flagship free school. At that time, the school's tuition fee was £7,620 for its secondary school students. According to the school's Head Teacher, Derek Cassells, free school status allows the school the potential to double its attendance while retaining its character. As of September 2011, 135 students were enrolled. The school had applied to open two branch schools in 2014 for 11- to 18-year-old students. One would be in Woodbridge, Suffolk, near a community of TM practitioners in Rendlesham, and the other would be at Oldfield House in the London borough of Richmond upon Thames. They would expand by "one year group at a time, with 20 pupils in each year". The Rendlesham school proposal was denied by the Department For Education in early 2012.

== Criticism ==
The school's 2011 qualification for government funding was criticised by the Lancashire branch of the National Union of Teachers who called it the funding of the "education of the members of a religious sect" with links to a defunct political party. A spokesperson for the School responded to the criticism saying the school is run by an "independent charitable company" and its Consciousness Based Education approach is non-religious and has no links to any political party.

Further criticism came in June 2011 from the Liberal Democrat MP for Southport, John Pugh, and the Liverpool city council leader, Joe Anderson, both of whom attacked the government for funding the Maharishi School while depriving funds from mainstream schools. Labour MP Lisa Nandy made similar complaints in August and the British Humanist Association (BHA) voiced concerns about the school's "spiritual and 'pseudoscientific' teaching". The school's headmaster, Cassells, said: "We bring a balanced curriculum and all we do is introduce a few minutes of meditation three times a day". A Department of Education spokesman said "the Maharishi School, like all Free Schools, will enter pupils for the same exams as other state schools" and "will be open to all pupils of any or no faith."

In May 2012 a group of professors and science communicators, which included Edzard Ernst, wrote a letter to The Guardian calling the Maharishi school a "serious threat to education" for its teaching of pseudoscience, comparing it to the dangers of creationist schools.

In December 2012, the school was reprimanded by the Department for Education for not entering any of its pupils into compulsory National Curriculum assessments. The school responded by saying that it did not receive the appropriate materials and guidance in time to conduct the tests, but has committed to do so in the future.

== See also ==
- Transcendental Meditation in education
