= Maharishi University of Management and Technology =

State private university in India

- महर्षि युनिवर्सिटी ऑफ़ मैनेजमेंट और टेक्नोलॉजी
- Type: State Private University
- Established: 2018
- Affiliations: UGC
- Chancellor: Brahmachari Girish
- Vice-Chancellor: Dr. Pankaj Chande
- Location: Maharishi Road near Maharishi Vidya mandir, Mangla, Chhattisgarh 09893063968 07752-414301 PIN- 495 001, Bilaspur, Chhattisgarh, India; 22°06′14″N 82°07′14″E
- Campus: Rural
- Website: www.mumt.com
- Location within Chhattisgarh Location within India

Maharishi University of Management and Technology is a state private university established vide Chhattisgarh Private Universities (Establishment and Operations) (Amendment) Act 2018 and received the assent of Hon’ble Governor of C.G. on 13 April 2018 followed by publication of Chhattisgarh Gazette (Extraordinary) on 17 April 2018. Brahmachari (Dr.) Girish Chandra Varma is the Chancellor, Dr. Pankaj T. Chande is the Vice-Chancellor and Dr. Vijay Kumar Garudik is the Registrar of Maharishi University of Management and Technology.

The Statutes and Ordinances of the University were approved by the C.G. State Government on 14 October 2019. The name of the University has been included in the list maintained by the University Grant Commission (UGC) on its website www.ugc.ac.in and member of Association of Indian Universities (AIU), New Delhi. Maharishi University of Management and Technology (MUMT), Mangla, Bilaspur (C.G) is the first private university in Bilaspur City.

== Description ==
The University is listed under 2(f) of the (UGC Act 1956), University Grants Commission (India) and was established vide Chhattisgarh Private Universities (Establishment and Operations) (Amendment) Act 2018. All students are trained in Yoga, Pranayam and Transcendental Meditation. Maharishi University of Management and Technology is a part of Maharishi Mahesh Yogi Ji's worldwide educational institutions.

== Programmes ==
Maharishi University of Management & Technology (MUMT), Bilaspur (Chhattisgarh) offers numerous Undergraduate, Postgraduate, Diploma, Certificate, and Foundation Courses for the Academic Session 2020-21. The MUMT offers following job-oriented courses for the Academic Session of 2020-21:'

Management:- BBA, MBA, Science: B.Sc. (Maths), Commerce: B.com, Computer & IT: BCA, B.Sc. (IT), M.Sc. (IT)

Social Work: BSW, MSW, Education: D. El Ed, Vedic Science: BA, MA (Yoga), BA (Jyotish), and Arts: BA, BA (Journalism & Mass Communication).

PG Diploma and Diploma Courses:- PG Diploma in Yoga (PGDY), PG Diploma in Computer Application (PGDCA), PG Diploma in Public Administration (PGDPA), Diploma in Music (DM), Diploma in Multimedia & Animation (DMA), Diploma in Computer Application (DCA), Diploma in Fire Safety & Disaster Management (DFSDM), Diploma in Hotel Management & Hospitality (DHMS) and Diploma in Financial Accounting & Taxation.

Certificate Courses:- 2D Animation, Working With Graphics, Working with audio-Video, Designing for Web using Markup Language & Style Sheet, Developing Interactive Web Pages, Web Animation & Scripting with Animation CC, Photoshop, Digital Illustration, Interior Designing, and Fashion Designing.

Advanced Certificate Programmes:- Web Designing, Audio-Video Editing, 2D Digital Animation, Digital Graphics, and 2D Animation, Basics of 3DAnimation, Digital Architecture, Interior Designing, and Fashion Designing.

Professional Certificate Programmes:- Graphic Design & Visualization, 3D Animation, Basics of 3D Animation, Interior Designing, and Fashion Designing.
