= Maharishi School (US) =

Private secondary school in Fairfield, Iowa, United States

Coordinates: 41.0153°N 91.9671°W

Location
- 804 Dr. Robert Keith Wallace Drive; Fairfield, Iowa; United States

Information
- Type: Day and Boarding School
- Motto: "Knowledge is Structured in Consciousness"
- Established: 1974
- Headmaster: Brett Potash
- Faculty: 44
- Enrollment: 220+ K-12
- Colors: Green and Gold
- Mascot: Pioneers
- Website: www.maharishischool.org

Maharishi School (formerly Maharishi School of the Age of Enlightenment or MSAE) is an independent, non-denominational, college preparatory school located in Fairfield, Iowa, USA. The school was founded in 1974 and received state accreditation in 1986. It is located on a 10-acre campus within the main campus of the Maharishi University of Management.

The school has an open admissions policy, and its curriculum includes the practice of the Transcendental Meditation technique. In addition to traditional academic subjects, the school teaches a course called "Consciousness, Connections and Life Skills." The school and its students have received numerous awards in state, national and international competitions for science, the arts, creativity and athletics.

== History ==
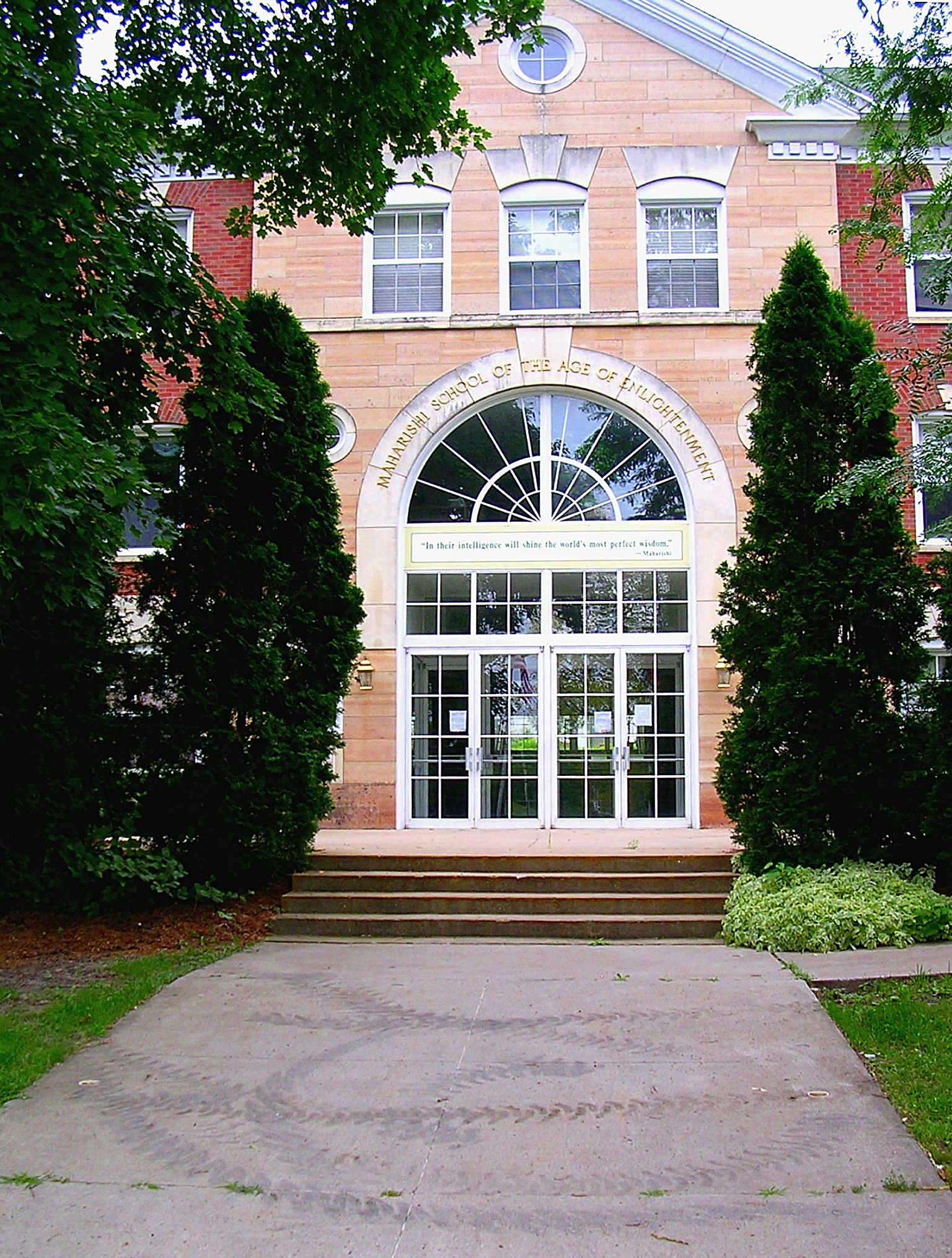
Entrance to the Maharishi School

Maharishi School is one of seven college preparatory schools in the state of Iowa and began in 1974 as an elementary school with 12 students providing education to the children of the faculty of Maharishi International University. Enrollment was then opened to children from the community and in 1981 the Upper School was formed.

In 1986, the school received accreditation from the Independent Schools Association of the Central States. In 1987, grades K-6 also received accreditation from the Iowa Department of Education. Grades 7–12 then received accreditation in 1987 from the Iowa Department of Education as a college preparatory school due to the high percentage of graduates being accepted at four-year colleges and universities.

In 1989, the school began to offer single-gender classes whenever class enrollment was sufficient. In 2003, Maharishi School split into three schools with gender divisions that included the Boys‚ Middle and Upper School, the Girls‚ Middle and Upper School and the Lower School, grades K-6.

In 1996, after eight years of single-gender classes, Maharishi School and two Iowa school districts were advised to "discontinue gender-segregated classes". Maharishi School officials rejected the state Department of Education's order. The issue came under the review of the Iowa Attorney General who sent a letter warning the school of a violation of Title IX and of state civil rights laws. Despite possible loss of public accreditation and state tax money for textbooks and local services, the school decided to continue single-gender classes the following school year. The school's website indicates the school now maintains single and mixed-gender classes.

The school received a visit from talk show host Oprah Winfrey in October 2011. A show titled "America's Most Unusual Town" aired on the Oprah Winfrey Network on March 25, 2012 featuring Winfrey's visit to the Maharishi School and other places in Fairfield.

== Campus ==
The Maharishi School campus consists of 10 acres (40,000 m^{2}) located on the main campus of Maharishi University of Management (MUM).

According to the school's web site, the main, three-story building houses the Lower School and the Girls School. There are two school libraries, three computer labs, three art rooms, a digital and a conventional photography lab, and two music rooms. There is also an auditorium "for performances and community gatherings". There is a large courtyard in the center of the campus with the Boys School and Foster Hall located on the north side.

The school has a large greenhouse on the west side, which serves as a living classroom for four-season, organic gardening methods and environmental science. The school's facilities are geared towards sustainability and include a rainwater catchment system, a solar-powered water system for the greenhouse, edible landscaping and recycling and composting programs. In 2004, the greenhouse won the Organic Silver Award from the Rodale Institute for its permaculture style of gardening.

In 2009, the school received a grant from the Iowa Department of Management to construct the first Arbor Day-certified Nature Explore classroom in southeast Iowa. A Nature Explore classroom is a model outdoor classroom for nature-based learning, designed to connect children to nature. Maharishi School "has access to large recreation facilities" at MUM including a "climbing wall, indoor track, cardio and weight training, tennis courts and a swimming pool." It also has a field house for statewide, inter-school, sporting events.

== Academics ==
Maharishi School has an open admissions policy and any child who has at least one of their parents practicing the Transcendental Meditation technique may enroll. Standardized test scores or grade point average (GPA) are not a factor in admission. Financial aid is offered to families with demonstrated need. A 2012 news article reported that the school accepts boarding students, who are situated with local host families that are supervised by the school. Boarded students come from around the world including the US, China, Germany, South Africa and Mexico.

The Upper School curriculum includes the traditional core subjects of math, science, English, and social studies. The curriculum also includes speech, art, music, writing, senior thesis, photography, History Fair, physics, sculpture, painting, world history, and yoga. Students may study Sanskrit, which is offered as a foreign language. Students also study the curriculum known as the Science of Creative Intelligence (SCI), which is said to be the study of universal principles of natural law governing the universe. The principles of SCI are integrated into all academic course content. The school describes its curriculum and educational philosophy as Consciousness-Based Education.

=== Awards and competitions ===
Maharishi School students have won a number of awards in statewide, national and International competitions. In 2004, officials said that over the past ten years their students have "scored in the 99th percentile on standardized tests", that 95 percent of their graduates attend college and "the school graduates 10 times the national average of National Merit Scholar finalists" "Critics contend that most private schools that charge $12,000 a year for high school tuition likely would be able to post similar numbers". As of 2010, 34 students at the school have become National Merit Scholarship finalists and 40 students have been semi-finalists.

The school leads the state of Iowa with six championships at the Destination ImagiNation competitions and has won six world championships through 2010. At the 2005 global finals, Maharishi School students took more first- and second-place awards than any other school, according to a press release.

In 2011, Maharishi School students received 40 of the 205 awards given at the Eastern Iowa Science and Engineering Fair, had eight finishes in the top three at the State Science and Technology Fair of Iowa, won a gold and bronze medal at the International SWEEEP Olympiad, fourth place at the Intel International Science and Engineering Fair and won the state championship at the U.S. Stockholm Junior Water Prize National Competition.

== Fine arts ==
The Arts Department consists of Visual Arts and Music. Vocal and instrumental music are offered during school hours and as extracurricular programs. Maharishi School is a member of the Photo Imaging Education Association (PIEA). Middle and Upper School students have won awards in many of the PIEA International Student–Teacher Photo Competition and Exhibition events, including Grand Prizes in 2002 and 2004.

In 2009, students won seven out of the 11 awards available in Iowa's Second Congressional District in the Congressional Art Competition, a nationwide event sponsored by the members of the U.S. House of Representatives. In 2010, Maharishi students again "dominated" the competition in the Congressional Art Contest by taking the first and third place awards as well as "three of the six honorable mentions" in Iowa's Second District. Senior Kenzie Wacknov received the top award.

== Athletics ==
The Pioneers formerly competed Southeast Iowa Superconference (South Division), the Pioneers no longer offer any of the non–sharing agreement sports sponsored by the SEISC. Any student can be a member of an interscholastic sports team. Varsity coaches attribute the success of their teams to the players' practice of Transcendental Meditation.

The Pioneers send their athletes to Fairfield to compete in the Southeast Conference in the following sports:

- Girls' Volleyball
- Boys' & Girls' Tennis
- Boys' & Girls' Soccer

=== Tennis ===
Maharishi School tennis program began in 1988. Since then, the boys’ tennis team has won 19 state singles, doubles and team championships, a state record. The boys' team won an unprecedented third triple crown in 2014, following victories in the team championship, the singles title and the doubles title in 1999 and 2000. Boys' 5-time Class 1A State Champions (1991, 1999, 2000, 2002, 2014)

Maharishi School's former tennis coach Lawrence Eyre has been featured in Sports Illustrated and was the Iowa Tennis Association's Coach of the Year in 2000. Eyre was the 2007 Central Sectional Coach of the Year selected by the National Federation of State High School Associations and the United States Professional Tennis Association(USPTA) 2008 Missouri Valley Coach of the Year in 2008. Eyre was selected by the USPTA as National High School Coach of the Year in 2009.

=== State Championships ===
- Golf - Boys' 1996 Class 1A State Champions
- Tennis - Boys' (individuals, team, singles and doubles) Class 1A State Champions 1991, 1999, 2000, 2002, 2014

== Student life ==
Students learn various practices designed to promote good health. The school's natural health program includes self-pulse assessment, yoga postures (asanas), breathing exercises (pranayama) and guidelines for a healthy diet and daily routine. The school also serves food and has a policy of prohibiting tobacco, alcoholic beverages, and other drugs on its campus.

Maharishi School students participate in a variety of athletic, performance and visual art programs. The school also offers a summer day camp program for children 5–10 years old. Students are required to wear a school uniform, which consists mainly of a white shirt and tie for boys and a white blouse and plaid skirt for girls.

== Reception ==
Some families have moved to Fairfield so their children may attend Maharishi School. The school has been showcased as a "Cool School" by Teen People magazine.

The May 2004 issue of Worth magazine featured Maharishi School, along with seven other private schools, as representing some of the "finest alternative private education options". Maharishi School was featured in a 2006 edition of the television show CBS Sunday Morning.

== Notable alumni ==
- Ben Foster, actor
- Claire Hoffman, journalist
- Eli Lieb, pop singer-songwriter

== Other Maharishi Schools ==
A Maharishi School of the Age of Enlightenment was located in Wheaton, Maryland, USA. In addition, there is a Maharishi School in Skelmersdale, UK, one in Reservoir near Melbourne, Australia, and a Maharishi Secondary School for Girls in Mbale, Uganda.

== See also ==
- List of high schools in Iowa
