= Maharishi Mahesh Yogi Vedic University =

Private university in Madhya Pradesh

Maharishi Mahesh Yogi Vedic Vishwavidyalaya (University)
- Type: Private
- Established: 1995; 30 years ago
- Founder: Maharishi Mahesh Yogi
- Religious affiliation: Hinduism
- Academic affiliations: UGC and AIU
- Chancellor: Brahmachari Girish Verma
- Vice-Chancellor: Prof. Pramod Kumar Verma
- Academic staff: 100+
- Students: 2,500+
- Location: Katni, Madhya Pradesh, India; 23.513°N 80.319°E
- Campus: Rural
- Website: mmyv.org

Maharishi Mahesh Yogi Vedic University, also known as Maharishi Mahesh Yogi Vedic Vishwavidyalaya (MMYVV), is an accredited, statutory Private university located in Katni, Madhya Pradesh, India. It is part of the Maharishi Educational System and was established by the state legislature in 1995. It offers both graduate and undergraduate degree programs.

== History ==
The university is named after its founder, Maharishi Mahesh Yogi, who was instrumental in introducing the Transcendental Meditation technique to the world. Maharishi Mahesh Yogi Vedic Vishwavidyalaya was established by the Madhya Pradesh state legislature (Act #37) in 1995; the Maharishi has been called the "first chancellor of the university".

== Campuses ==
MMYVV is part of the Maharishi Educational System and is reported to have up to 250,000 students. It employs 10,000 faculty, administrators and staff across 250 of India's districts. MMYVV has campuses in Bhopal, Indore, Ujjain and Jabalpur. The campuses are reported to contain "state of the art infrastructure and facilities" including a library, audio-visual aids and computer labs. the campus also contains facilities for field and track as well as other outdoor and indoor sports.

The Bhopal campus is located on a 50-acre (200,000 m^{2}), plot near public transportation with separate in-residence facilities for up to 500 students. It also features facilities for horse riding and training.

The Indore campus is 8-acre (32,000 m^{2}) and includes and can support up to 300 students.

The Jabalpur campus is located on 150-acre (0.61 km^{2}) with "newly constructed Vastu" buildings next to the Narmada River. The campus is reported to have facilities for up to 400 students.

== Academics ==
MMYVV is a "statutory University" recognized by the University Grants Commission (UGC). MMYVV is also affiliated with the Association of Indian Universities. The university's BBA and BCA programs received the approval of the Directorate of Technical Education in 1988. The university's BEd program for training teachers is recognized by the National Council of Teachers Education (NCTE) and is offered at the campus in Jabalpur. The university also offers the PGDCA and DCA degrees. It also offers Professional Certificates to students who fulfill the requirements of their Modern Office Management and Dress Designing Manufacturing programs. The university offers graduate and post-graduate programs in the ancient history, languages and culture of India as well as one-year diploma programs.

According to the university other courses include Maharishi Vedic Approach to Health, Transcendental Meditation, Maharishi Corporate Development Maharishi Sthapatya Veda, TM-Sidhi program, Maharishi Gandharva Veda, Maharishi Jyotish and Yagya, Maharishi Global Administration through Natural Law and Maharishi Invincible Defense. A distance education program for vocational degrees is conducted through the university's campuses and study centers using an audio-video and telecast format. Distance education students also have "face-to-face interaction with faculty", and "work related field projects". The university's distance mode courses are approved by the Distance Education Council (DEC).

The university reportedly uses a "consciousness based education system" which includes the practice of the Transcendental Meditation technique whose aim is to provide further personal development.
