= Ramayana (disambiguation) =

Ramayana is one of the two major Sanskrit epics of ancient India.

Ramayana, Ramayan, or Ramayanam may also refer to:

== Arts and entertainment ==
=== Literature ===
- Kakawin Ramayana, 9-10th century Javanese rendering of the Sanskrit Ramayana
- Ramavataram, a 12th century Tamil version, written by Kambar
- Ramakien, a Thai version of Kamba Ramayanam
- Ranganatha Ramayanamu, an early 14th century Telugu version, written by Gona Budda Reddy
- Saptakanda Ramayana, the 14th or 15th century Assamese version, written by Madhava Kandali
- Bilanka Ramayana, an Odia version of Ramayana, by 15th-century poet Sarala Dasa
- Jagamohana Ramayana, an Odia version of Ramayana by 15th-century poet Balarama Dasa
- Krittivasi Ramayan, an early 15th century Bengali version, written by 14th century poet Krittibas Ojha
- Ramcharitmanas, the 16th century Awadhi Hindi version, written by Tulsidas
- Bhanubhakta Ramayana, a Nepali version of Valmiki Ramayana, written by Bhanubhakta Acharya
- Ramayana Kalpavruksham, Telugu-language epic poem by Viswanatha Satyanarayana
- The Ramayana (Narayan book), a 1972 English translation of Kamba Ramayana
- Ramayana (Rajagopalachari book), a 1957 abridged retelling of the Ramayana in English
- Ramayana in Human Physiology, a 2011 book by Tony Nader
- Ramayan 3392 A.D. or Ramayana Reborn, a comic book series

=== Film and television ===
- Sampoorna Ramayana, 1961 Hindi film directed by Babubhai Mistry
- Sampoorna Ramayanam (1958 film), a 1958 Tamil film directed by K. Somu
- Sampoorna Ramayanam (1971 film), a 1971 Telugu film directed by Bapu
- Ramayani, a 1945 Indian film
- Ramayan (1954 film), a Hindi religious film
- Ramayana: The Legend of Prince Rama, 1992 Indo-Japanese animated film
- Ramayana: The Epic, a 2010 Indian animated film
- Ramayan (1987 TV series), an Indian television series on DD National
- Ramayan (2001 TV series), an Indian television series on Zee TV
- Ramayan (2008 TV series), an Indian television series on NDTV Imagine
- Ramayan (2012 TV series), an Indian television series on Zee TV
- Ramayanam (1997 film), a mythological Telugu film
- Geet Ramayan, a 1955 Marathi rendering in poetic format by G. D. Madgulkar
- Shrimad Ramayan, a 2024 Indian television series on Sony Entertainment Television
- Ramayana: Part 1, a 2026 Indian film by Nitesh Tiwari

== People ==
- Ramayan Rai, Indian politician
- Ramayan Singh, Indian politician
- Ramayan Tiwari, Indian actor
- Ramayanam Sarveswara Sastry (1889–1962), Indian actor
- Ramayyan Dalawa, prime minister of the Kingdom of Travancore

== Other uses ==
- Ramayana bridge or Adam's Bridge, a bridge connecting Rameswaram to Mannar, India
- Ramayana Centre, Port Louis, Mauritius
- Ramayana Express, train in India
- Ramayana Water Park, Sattahip District, Chon Buri, Thailand
- Maharishi Mahesh Yogi Ramayan University, Ayodhya, India
- Viraat Ramayan Mandir, a Hindu temple in Bihar, India

== See also ==
- Ramayana Ballet, ballet versions of the epic
- Versions of the Ramayana, variants of the epic
- Ramayana in Tamil literature
- Monkey chant (disambiguation), or Ramayana monkey chant or Kecak, a form of Balinese dance based on the Ramayana
- Sampoorna Ramayana (disambiguation)
