= Maharishi University =

Maharishi University may refer to

- Maharishi International University, Iowa, United States
- Maharishi University of Information Technology, Uttar Pradesh, India
