= Sampur =

Sampur may refer to:

- Sampur, Russia, a rural locality (a selo) in Tambov Oblast, Russia
- Sampur, Trincomalee, a town in Trincomalee District, Sri Lanka

== See also ==
- Sampurna (disambiguation)
