= Bharat Utkarsh Mahayagya =

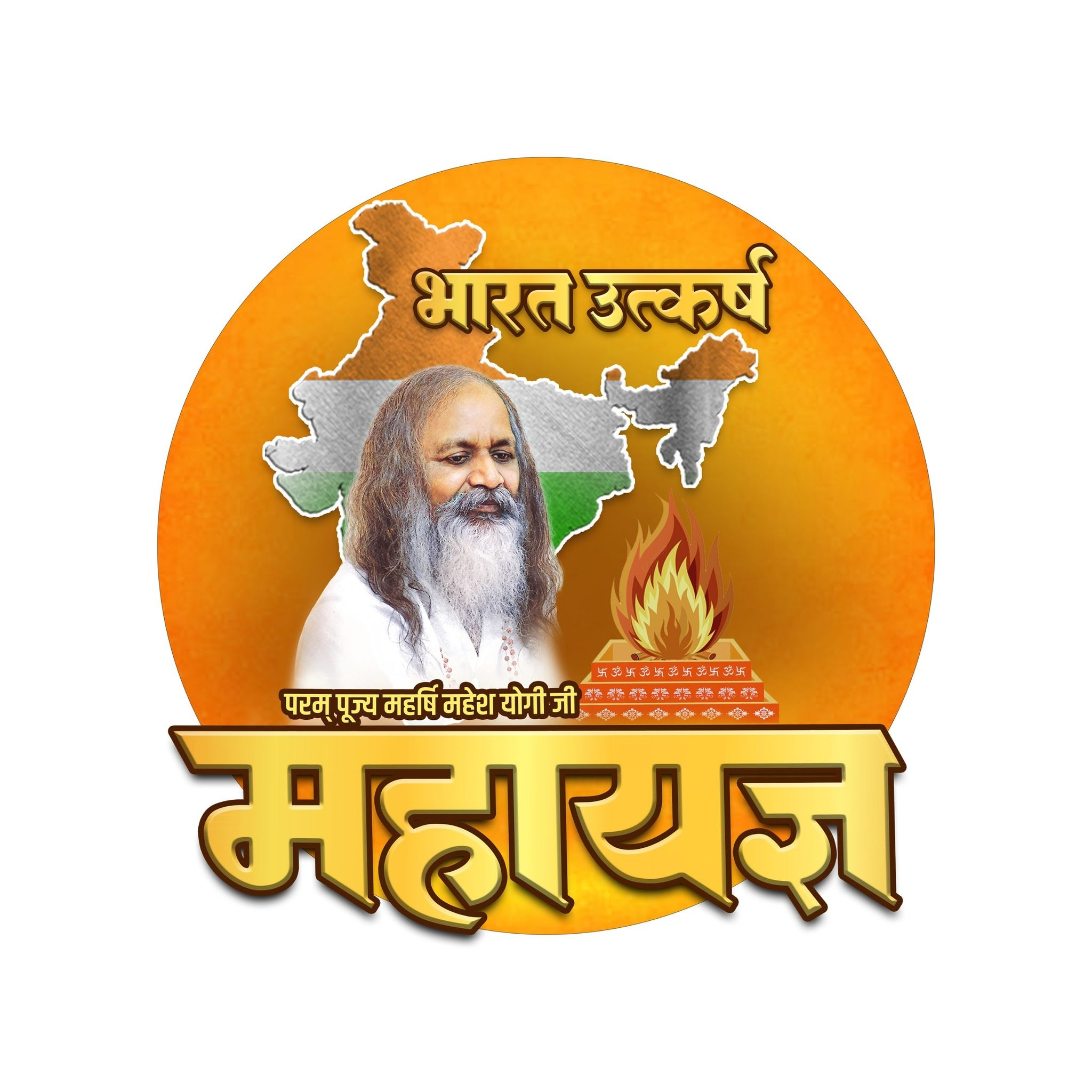

Bharat Utkarsh Mahayagya (Hindi: भारत उत्कर्ष महायज्ञ) is a national and religious yajna (ritual) held from 16 November 2025 to 25 November 2025 at the Maharshi Ashram in Noida.

It was inaugurated on 16 November 2025.

== Background ==
The Mahayagya was inspired by the His holiness Maharishi Mahesh Yogi and organized under the leadership of Ajay Prakash Shrivastava Its aim was to promote India's spiritual consciousness and advance the “Developed India 2047” national vision.

== Events ==
- Construction of 108 kunds (sacrificial fire pits) for the yajna.
- Continuous yajna rituals and offerings for 10 days.
- Participation of saints, scholars, and thousands of devotees.
- Cultural programs, discourses, and laser shows based on Ramayana and religious stories.

== Significance ==
- Strengthened India's spiritual consciousness and promoted cultural diversity.
- Inspired youth towards moral values, leadership, and self-reliance.
