= Sampurna =

Saṃpūrṇa (संपूर्ण) is a Sanskrit word which means complete, entire, or whole.

== Person ==
- Sampurna Lahiri, Indian film and television actress
- Dedi Indra Sampurna, Indonesian footballer
- Sampurnanand, (1891–1969), Indian teacher and politician, second Chief Minister of Uttar Pradesh from 1954 until 1960

== Others ==
- Sampurna Nagar, a town in Kheri district, Uttar Pradesh, India
- Sampurna raga, a raga in Indian classical music that has all seven swaras in their scale
- Sampurna Vikas Dal, a political party in the Indian state of Bihar

== See also ==
- Sampoorna Ramayana (disambiguation)
- Sampoerna, an Indonesian tobacco company
- Sampoorna, a school management system project in the Indian state of Kerala
