= David Wants to Fly =

- Theatrical poster
- Directed by: David Sieveking
- Written by: David Sieveking; Martin Witz (cowriter of narration)
- Produced by: Martin Heisler; Carl-Ludwig Rettinger
- Starring: David Sieveking; David Lynch; Marie Pohl; Paul McCartney; Ringo Starr; Mahesh Yogi
- Narrated by: David Sieveking
- Cinematography: Adrian Stähli
- Edited by: Martin Kayser-Landwehr
- Music by: Karl Stirner; PC Christensen (additional music)
- Production company: Lichtblick Film
- Distributed by: Neue Visionen (Germany)
- Release date: February 12, 2010 (Berlin)
- Running time: 96 minutes
- Languages: German; English; Hindi

David Wants to Fly is a 2010 German documentary film that follows its director, Berlin-based film school graduate David Sieveking, as he interacts with his film hero David Lynch, and explores the Transcendental Meditation movement. The film chronicles a period of time in Sieveking's life that includes his off-and-on relationship with his girlfriend as well as his travels to the United States, Holland and India. The film has received awards and honorable mentions as well as criticism.

== Background ==
After graduating from Deutsche Film- und Fernsehakademie Berlin, Sieveking, the film's director, learned the Transcendental Meditation technique and decided to document his personal experiences. According to Sieveking, he made the film because of his "interest in David Lynch," his lack of a job and his "frustration" with his film career. Film locations include Berlin and Hannover; Germany, New York City, Fairfield, Iowa, Vlodrop, The Netherlands, Seelisberg, Switzerland, and northern India. The film's production spanned five years and is distributed by companies in Germany, Switzerland, and Austria. In addition to Sieveking himself, the documentary features (in order of appearance): Marie Pohl, David Lynch, Donovan, Fred Travis, Raja Emmanuel, Raja Felix, Ringo Starr, Paul McCartney, Bob Roth, Michael Persinger, Mark Landau, Judith Bourque, Earl Kaplan and Swami Swaroopananda. The film includes archival footage of Maharishi Mahesh Yogi, George Harrison, Mia Farrow and Mike Love.

== Synopsis ==
In 2006, Sieveking, the German director, lead character, and narrator of the film, feels adrift after graduating from film school. At the time, he is living with his girlfriend, and he decides to travel to Fairfield, Iowa, to attend an event featuring David Lynch and Donovan. Afterwards, he and Pohl have an agreeable interview with Lynch about the Transcendental Meditation technique.

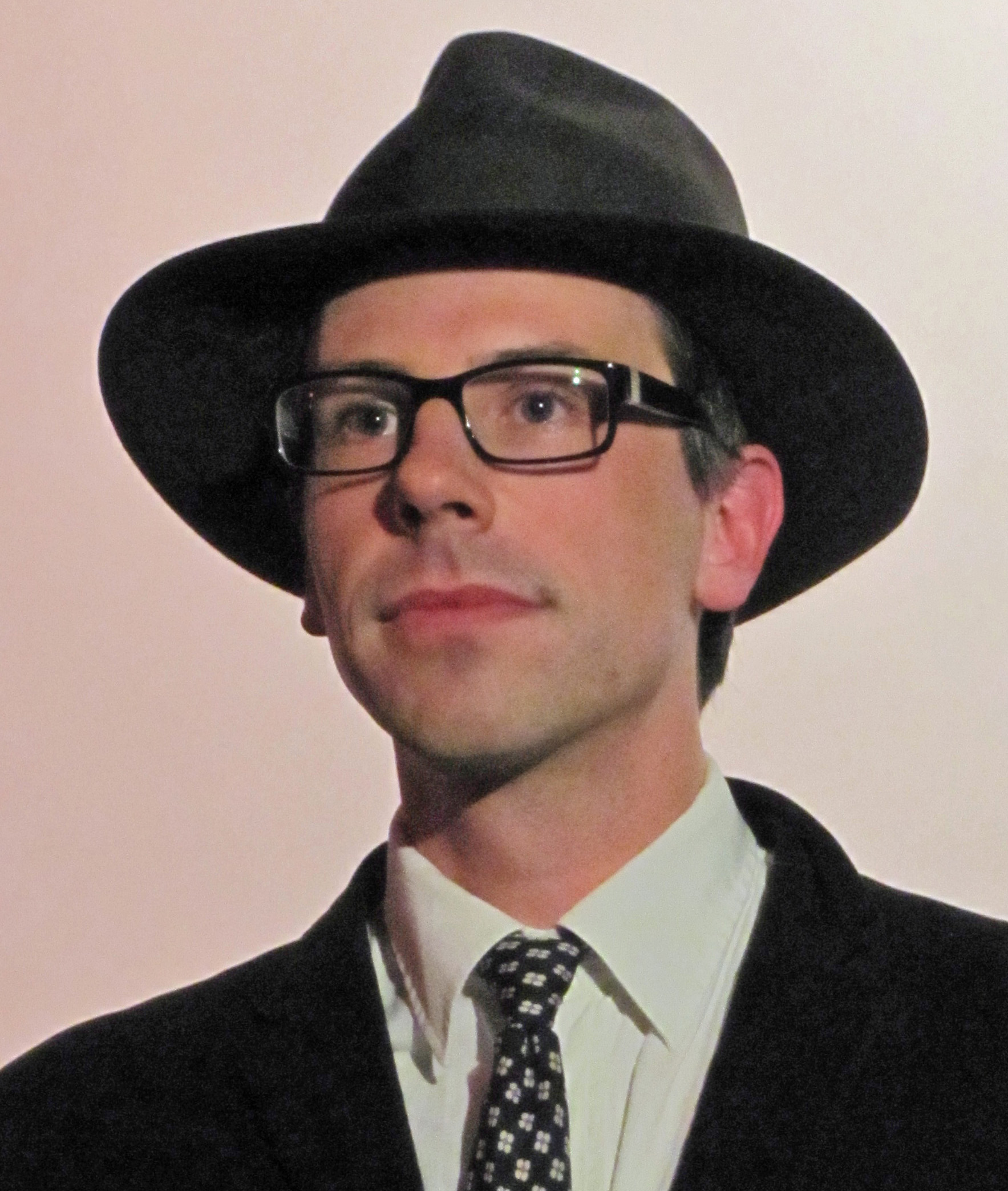
David Sieveking

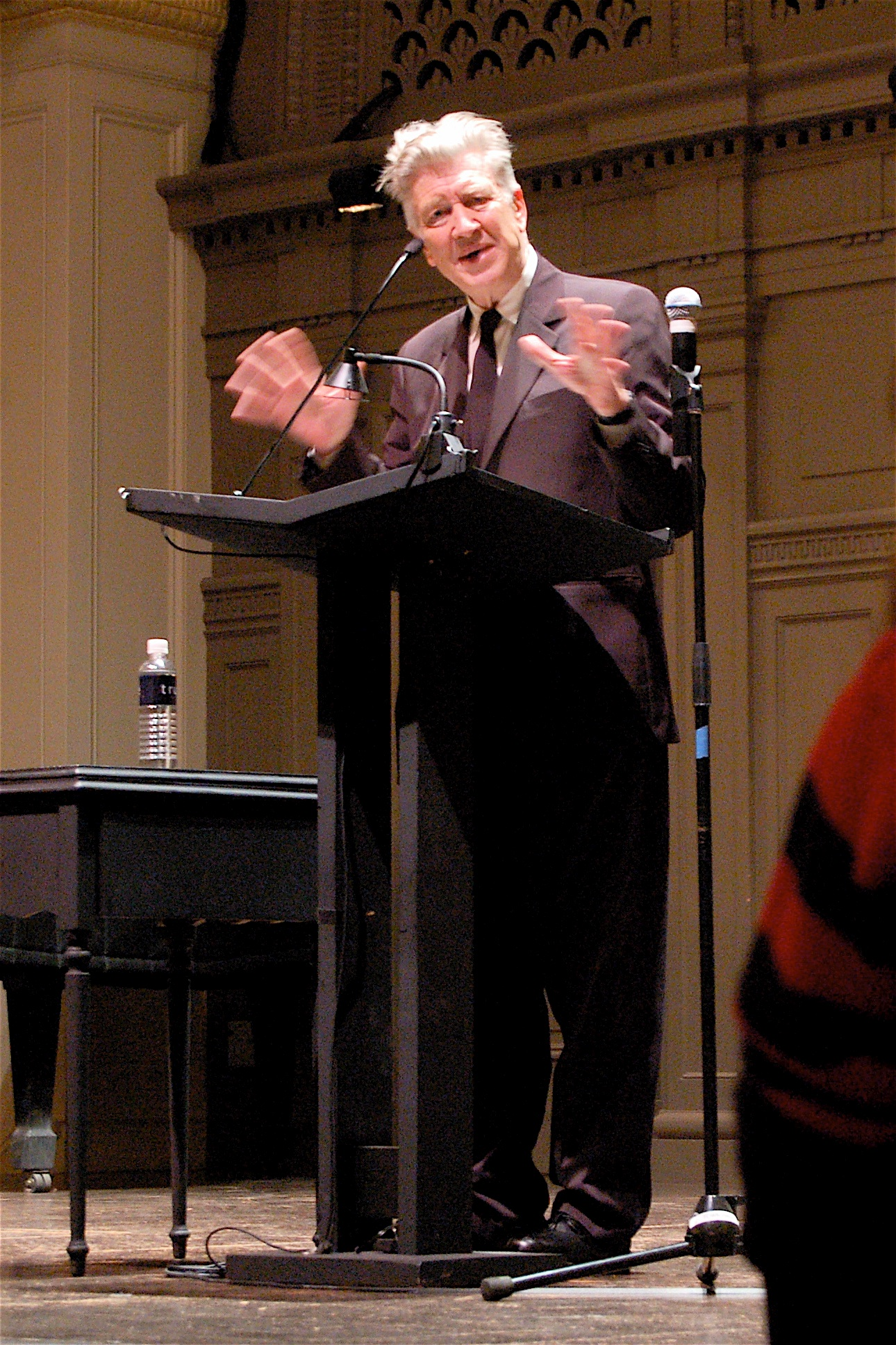
David Lynch on stage

Sieveking has his brain waves measured at Maharishi University of Management and decides to explore Transcendental Meditation (TM) further. He learns TM in Hannover, Germany, and says it gives him tranquility. In the meantime, Pohl moves to New York City leaving Sieveking behind and he feels lonely without her. When the Maharishi dies in February 2008, Sieveking attends the funeral ceremonies on the banks of the Ganges river, where hundreds of followers, relatives and TM movement leaders are in attendance. Back in Germany, Sieveking narrates that he has received funding for his film. He redecorates his apartment and makes arrangements with Pohl's grandmother to surprise Pohl when she returns to him. Several days after her return, Pohl leaves again for the U.S. and Sieveking travels to MERU, Holland for TM's 2008 Guru Purnima celebration and conference. Sieveking attends a presentation on the construction of a campus in the Brahmasthan (center point) of India, designed for 8,000 pandits who will recite vedic chants. At a meeting with Tony Nader, the new TM movement leader, another movement leader expresses dissent and Sieveking is told to stop filming. After a private meeting with Raja Emmanuel of Germany, Sieveking travels to Seelisberg, Switzerland, and is hosted by Raja Felix at the former headquarters of the Maharishi's World Government. Sieveking narrates that while he is enjoying his Transcendental Meditation practice, he is beginning to wonder if the organisation is a business that sells enlightenment.

Sieveking attends a public presentation by David Lynch in Berlin during which Raja Emanuel is heckled by the crowd. That night, Lynch and Emanuel conduct a torchlight cornerstone-laying ceremony for a planned university in Teufelsberg (Devil's Mountain). Sieveking travels to New York to see Pohl and attend a David Lynch Foundation press conference featuring Paul McCartney and Ringo Starr. After some negotiation, Sieving is able to meet again with Lynch, who addresses Sieveking's skepticism about TM's herbal business and meditation organization. Later, Pohl argues with Sieveking on a train ride and accuses him of being "obsessed" with the TM movement and of "harassing" Lynch. After a walk on the beach they end their romantic relationship. Sieveking visits Michael Persinger, who assesses his brain wave activity during meditation and tells him about the dynamics of cults and how religious beliefs can impact important life decisions. Later, Sieveking is allowed to film a yogic flying competition but is refused entry to the Vedic pandit campus in Maharishi Vedic City, Iowa.

Sieveking travels to New Mexico, USA and meets with a middle-aged man who describes his personal experiences many years earlier of working with the Maharishi as a personal assistant. Sieveking also spends time with a former TM teacher, who is now a middle aged shaman who reminisces about her intimate personal relationship with the Maharishi as a young woman. Sieveking travels to Colorado, USA, to speak with a publisher and TM apostate who donated large sums of money that the donor felt were not used wisely. According to Sieveking's narration, if he doesn't allow Lynch to see the final cut of his film, he will be sued by Lynch's lawyer.

Sieveking travels to the pandit campus at the Bramasthan of India and, after dressing up like a pandit, he is given a tour of the facility and finds there are eight pandits performing vedic chanting. Sieveking attends a Hindu nighttime religious festival on the Ganges river, where candles are placed on leaves and floated down the river. He travels to a Jyotir Math monastery where Swami Swaroopananda speaks critically of the Maharishi's activities as a guru. Sieveking hikes to the source of the Ganges river, where he bathes and meditates. Returning to Berlin, Sieveking goes with Pohl to Teufelsberg to play his harmonica and for sightseeing with Pohl. The documentary ends with the film's credits interspersed with scenes of Sieveking and Pohl singing together while sitting on a bed.

== Reception ==
According to Sieveking, he "received legal threats from the David Lynch Foundation’s attorney", saying David Lynch did not "want to be part of the film". But Sieveking says that as of the film's Berlin premier in May 2010, "no steps have actually been taken." The movie was described by one reviewer at Berlin's Die Tageszeitung as "entertaining and enlightening", by another reviewer as a "completely stupid movie" created by a "pseudo-enlightened, Borsalino-wearing welfare hippie kid". The film was described by Berliner Morgenpost's Peter Zander as "a brilliant debut film" created by "Berlin's answer to Michael Moore", by Hamburg's Die Zeit, as a "bizarre documentary". and by James Adams of The Globe and Mail as "Frequently beautiful, always absorbing, sometimes hilarious, it deftly weaves Sieveking's various quests – for love, enlightenment, meaning, the truth – into a compelling whole." Peter Calder of The New Zealand Herald wrote that the "geeky" Sieveking's "decision to incorporate his personal romantic life into the narrative is an error, but as a study of the more ludicrous excesses of the global business known as Transcendental Meditation, it's a cracker, an alternately hilarious and sobering study of credulity and greed." In the Denver Post Lisa Kennedy wrote that the film is a "documentary gem" which is "more Werner Herzog than Lynchian". Vanessa Farquharson of Canada's National Post described it as "filled with both wildly entertaining anecdotes and hard-nosed investigative journalism".

The Star Tribune of Minneapolis while giving the film three stars (out of four) printed "the documentary strikes a delicate balance between reverence and mounting skepticism as Sieveking follows the money sprinkled along TM's path to enlightenment." Gazeta Wyborcza, Warsaw, described a film that was "a little narcissistic, but, perhaps because of this, painfully honest". Daily Variety said that the "[t]ech package is first-rate, particularly the beautifully composed images of Adrian Stahli and pacey cutting of Martin Kayser-Landwehr. Karl Stirner’s well-used score provides ironic commentary." Karin Badt, "associate professor of Cinema and Theater in Paris", describes it as a "successful documentary" with interviews that are “effective and fresh.” She writes the film has “major flaws” that include the filmmaker's preoccupation with his girlfriend over meditation, and his characterization "of TM as a nefarious cult".

The film has received the Hessian Film Award (Hessischer Filmpreis), Frankfurt, Germany (2010) and the International Film Critics Jury's Special Prize, Message to Man International Film Festival, St. Petersburg, Russia (2010) It also received an Honorable Mention of Millennium Award Jury at the Planete Doc Film Festival, Warsaw, Poland in 2010. and Special Mention at Viennale in 2011

== Distribution ==
The film was premiered at the Berlin International Film Festival in February, 2010. It has been shown at 31 other film festivals including:

- Lichter Filmtage, (Frankfurt, Germany) March 2010
- Buenos Aires International Festival of Independent Cinema, April 2010
- Hot Docs Canadian International Documentary Festival, (Toronto, Canada) May 2010
- Festival du Nouveau Cinéma, (Montreal, Canada) October 2010
- Aarhus Film Festival, (Aarhus, Denmark) November 2010
- Festivus Film Festival, (Denver, Colorado) January 2011
- Palm Springs International Film Festival, January 2011
- German Gems, (San Francisco, California) January 2011
- Minneapolis-St. Paul International Film Festival, April 2011
- Encounters South African International Documentary Film Festival, (Cape Town and Johannesburg, South Africa) June 2011
- Viennale, (Vienna, Austria) November 2011
