= Science of Creative Intelligence =

The Science of Creative Intelligence (SCI) was developed by Maharishi Mahesh Yogi as an effort to integrate modern physics, such as unified field theory, with ancient Vedic beliefs and scripture, ultimately proposing that pure consciousness (including creativity and intelligence) underlies the universe and a person can connect to that consciousness through Transcendental Meditation (TM). SCI has been criticized as a pseudoscience.

== Overview ==
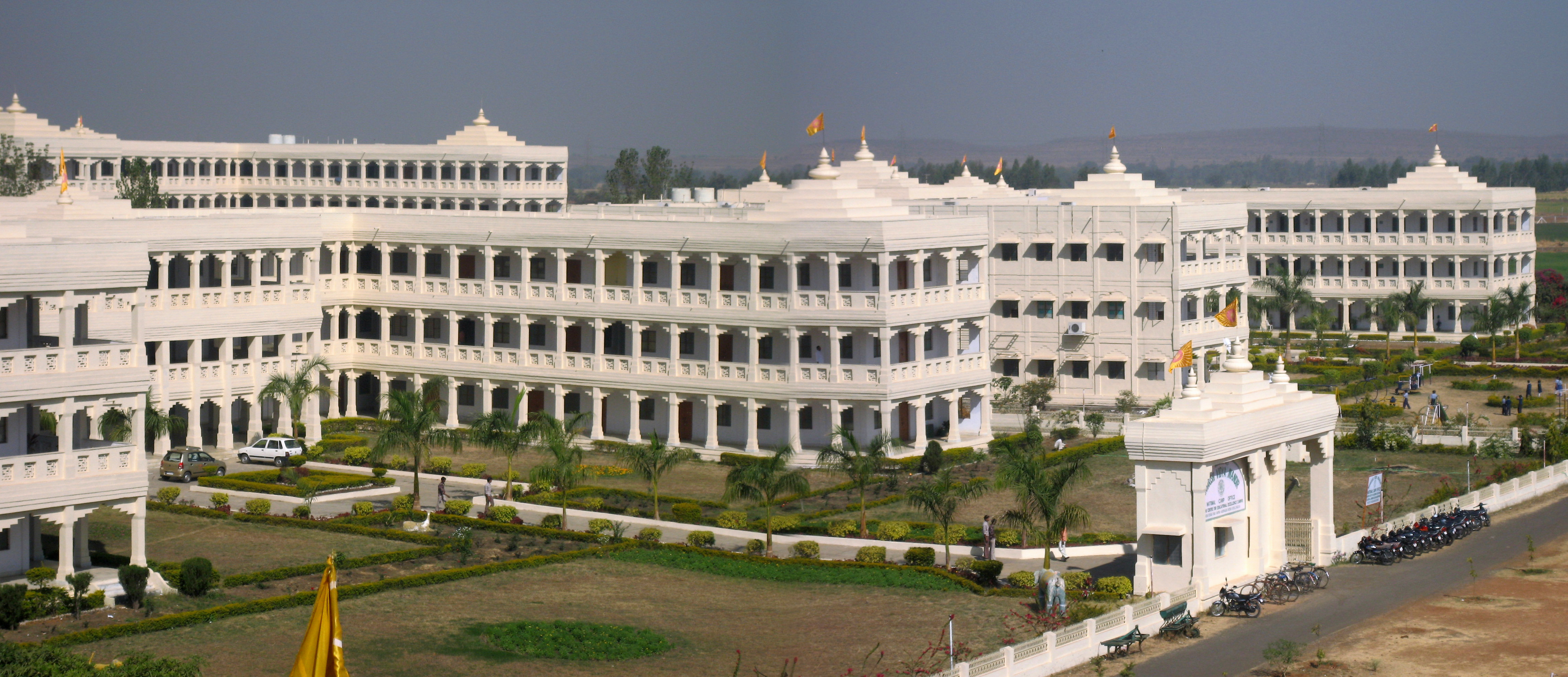
Maharishi Institute of Management in Bhopal, India, where SCI is taught as part of the curriculum.

In 1961, the Maharishi created the "International Meditation Society for the Science of Creative Intelligence" and, in 1971, inaugurated "Maharishi's Year of Science of Creative Intelligence," describing SCI as a link between "modern science with ancient Vedic science." Between 1970-1973, various SCI symposiums were held in places such as Humboldt State University and University of Massachusetts, attended by international scientists. In 1974, the Maharishi created a "World Plan" to spread SCI across the world.

=== Education ===
SCI has been integrated into the curriculum of various universities across the world, including Maharishi International University (MIU) in Fairfield, Iowa, The Maharishi College of Natural Law in Odisha, India, and the Maharishi Institute of Management with various campuses all across India. For a time, a 33-lesson video course on SCI was available at universities such as Stanford, Yale, the University of Colorado, the University of Wisconsin, and Oregon State University. In 2010, it was reported that children at the Maharishi School in Lancashire were taught SCI principles. Children in other schools, such as those in Iowa, Maryland, and the United Kingdom were also taught SCI as part of their primary school education.

=== Medicine ===
SCI also served as the foundation for the Maharishi Vedic Approach to Health (MVAH), an ayurvedic alternative medicine founded by the Maharishi during the mid-1980s, based on models and practices of health and disease that conflict with modern medicine and biology. According to MVAH researcher Hari Sharma, their model understands the human body as an abstract pattern of intelligence, drawing from quantum mechanics and Vedic tradition to postulate the existence of "a unified field of pure, non-material intelligence and consciousness whose modes of vibration manifest as the material universe." Tony Nader, as successor to the Maharishi and "maharaja" of the TM movement, has written books detailing astrological influence of the planets upon the human brain and correlations between Vedic literature and human physiology in an overarching attempt to find scientific basis for SCI. This includes using Vedic mantras in efforts to "to enliven the inner intelligence of the body" and heal a person of disease through sound vibration.

=== Physics ===
Physicist and MIU president John Hagelin proposed that unified field theory is the same as with the Maharishi's "unified field of consciousness", but this postulation was rejected by "virtually every theoretical physicist in the world" in 2006, with academic peers "ostracizing" Hagelin for connecting science with a "form of Hinduism that doesn't acknowledge its roots." Dennis Roark, former chairman of the physics department at MIU, referred to Hagelin's work as "crackpot science".

== Criticism ==
The Science of Creative Intelligence has been criticized as unscientific in nature. SCI (and TM in general) have been described by scientists, academics, and skeptics as containing pseudoscientific claims, including for its goals of supernatural abilities (such as yogic flying) and for obfuscating its Vedic-Hindu beliefs. SCI has been compared to creationism and characterized as religious in nature, including indoctrination into its metaphysics (including "creative intelligence") and participation in Sanskrit puja rituals invoking Hindu deities. In 1977, a US district court ruled that a TM-based curriculum in SCI that was being taught in New Jersey schools was religious in nature, violating the First Amendment and therefore prohibited.
