= Yogic flying =

Technique of Transcendental Meditation

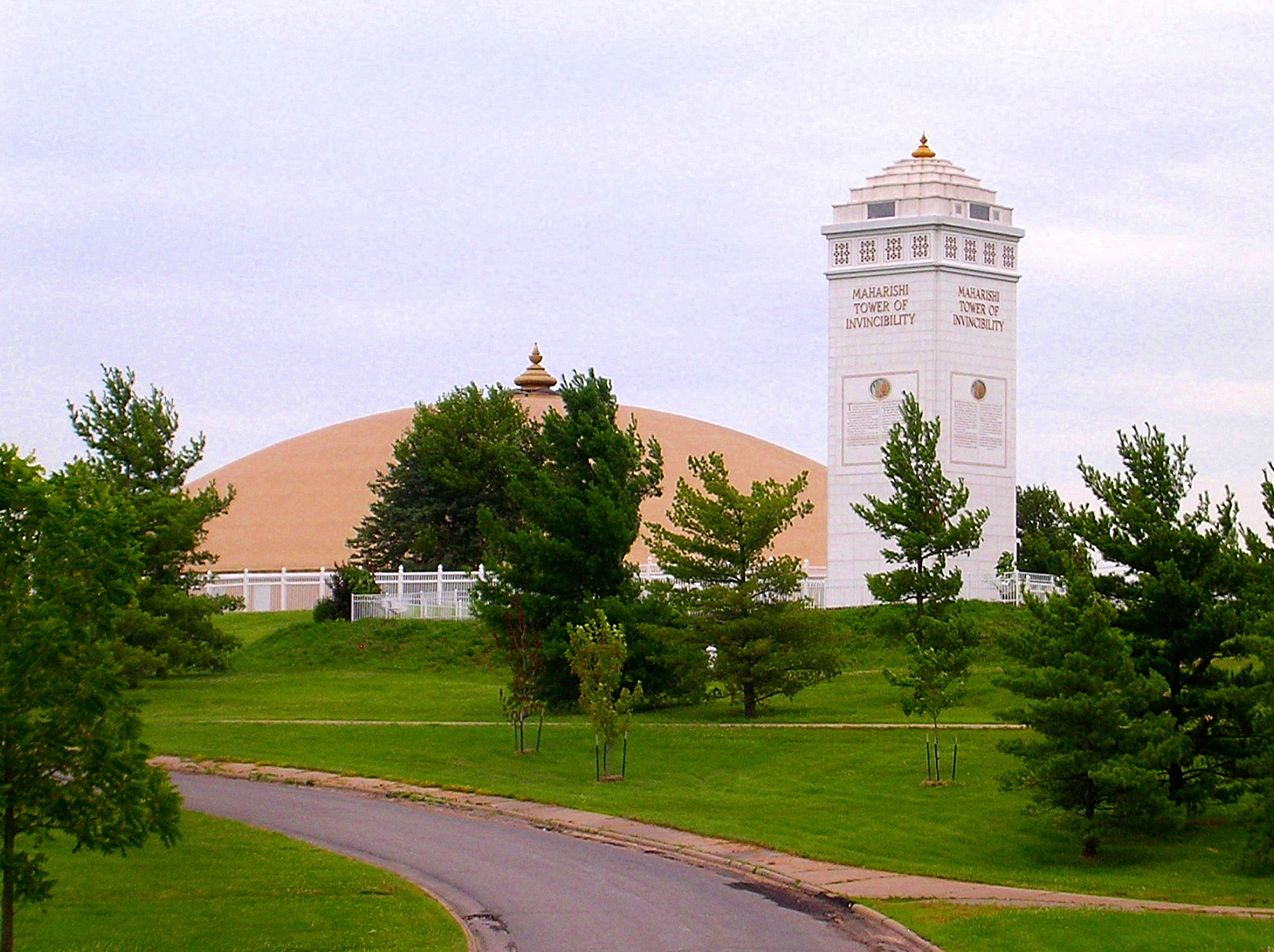
Campus of Maharishi International University in Fairfield, Iowa, including the Golden Domes used for group practice of Yogic Flying

Yogic flying is a mental-physical technique and exercise done by practitioners of Transcendental Meditation (TM) which features the participant hopping while cross-legged. Yogic flying is part of the TM-Sidhi program created in the 1970s by TM's founder Maharishi Mahesh Yogi, who claimed that if enough people practiced yogic flying (specifically the square root of 1 per cent of the population) at the same time and in the same location, then benefits will emerge in the surrounding society; this was known as the "Extended Maharishi Effect". According to TM teacher-spokesperson Bob Roth, the first stage of the technique is hopping, the second stage is when the body briefly hovers, and the third stage is "mastery of the sky" where the body can fly freely in the air.

According to a TM website, the participation of hundreds of Yogic Flyers in Germany brought "coherence and unity in the collective consciousness of Germany" and triggered the fall of the Berlin Wall. John Hagelin (dubbed the "Raja of Invincible America" by TM) claimed that a 4,000 group of Yogic Flyers in Washington, D.C. caused a reduction in the local crime rate. In 1999, Hagelin suggested that NATO should establish an elite corps of 7,000 yogic flyers at a cost of $33 million in order to end the Kosovo War. In 1992, the Maharishi sent groups of Yogic Flyers around the world (India, Brazil, China, etc.) with the goal of causing world peace through their international group practice. Filmmaker David Lynch devoted efforts towards the Maharishi's goal of world peace through his David Lynch Foundation, specifically aiming to raise billions of dollars in order to create a "peace-creating factory" of over 8,000 participants. Bob Roth, CEO of the David Lynch Foundation, has admitted that nobody has ever observed a practitioner begin to hover or fly through the yogic flying technique.

Yogic Flying and its associated Science of Creative Intelligence are taught in universities around the world, including the Maharishi International University in Fairfield, Iowa, and the Maharishi Institute of Management campuses all across India.

Since the early years of TM, the Maharishi has made similar claims of supernatural abilities obtainable through his meditation technique, such as invisibility and invincibility, and these claims created a period of media controversy for the movement. The impact of yogic flying is unclear due to cherry-picked data, and the claimed effects of yogic flying are not scientific and lack causal basis. In 2014, a meta-analysis of meditation research found "insufficient evidence that mantra meditation programs [such as TM] had an effect on any of the psychological stress and well-being outcomes".

== See also ==
- Transcendental Meditation
