= Monkey chant (disambiguation) =

The Ramayana monkey chant, or Kecak, is a form of Balinese dance and music drama.

Monkey Chant, monkey chant or monkey chanting may refer to:

- "Monkey Chant", a piece by Jade Warrior from Floating World
- Monkey chanting, racist calls targeting sportsmen of sub-Saharan African descent

== See also ==
- Ramayana (disambiguation)
