= Maharishi Mahesh Yogi Ramayan University =

University in Ayodhya, India

Maharishi Mahesh Yogi Ramayan Vishwavidyalaya (MMYRV)
- Other names: Ramayan University, Ayodhya
- Motto: बौद्धिक पुनर्जागरण से प्रभाव शालीनता
- Type: Private
- Established: 12 January 2025
- Founder: Maharishi Mahesh Yogi
- Affiliations: University Grants Commission (India)
- Chancellor: Dr. Ajay Prakash Shrivastava
- Location: Ayodhya, Uttar Pradesh, India; 26.7945°N 82.2248°E
- Campus: 21 acres (8.5 ha); Rural
- Colours: Maroon and Yellow
- Website: Ramayan University, Ayodhya

Maharishi Mahesh Yogi Ramayan University (Ramayan University) is a private university located in Ayodhya, Uttar Pradesh, India. The university was established on 12 January 2025 with the vision of imparting ancient Indian knowledge systems such as Ramayan, Vedic science, Sanskrit, Indian philosophy, and Transcendental Meditation alongside contemporary academic disciplines. The institution is named after spiritual leader Maharishi Mahesh Yogi, who is also the founder of the global Transcendental Meditation movement.

== History ==
The idea for the university was inspired by Maharishi Mahesh Yogi's vision of making Ayodhya the global hub of Vedic knowledge. The university was formally established in 2025 under the aegis of Maharishi Mahesh Yogi Sansthan and with approval from the Government of Uttar Pradesh.

The institution began academic operations in 2025, offering programs rooted in Indian scriptures, consciousness-based education, Vedic sciences, and Ramayan studies, along with interdisciplinary and professional programs.

== Governance ==
The founding Chancellor of the university is Dr. Ajay Prakash Shrivastava, a senior member of Maharishi organizations in India.

== Campus ==
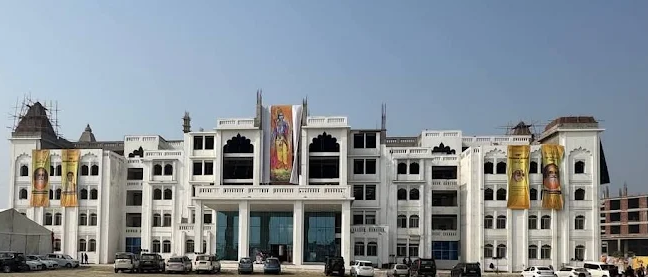
Ramayan University Campus

The campus is located in the spiritual city of Ayodhya, along the banks of the Saryu River. It features traditional Indian architectural elements inspired by Ramayan-era design. The university also houses meditation halls, Vedic gurukuls, digital classrooms, and an e-library of ancient scriptures.

== Academic Programs ==
Maharishi Mahesh Yogi Ramayan University offers undergraduate, postgraduate, diploma, and research programs in:

- Ramayan Studies
- Sanskrit and Indian Philosophy
- Vedic Science and Consciousness
- Yoga and Transcendental Meditation
- Engineering
- Business & Management

== Affiliations and Recognition ==
The university is recognized by the University Grants Commission (UGC). The curriculum aligns with the National Education Policy 2020 (NEP 2020), emphasizing holistic development, multilingual education, and integration of Indian knowledge systems.

== Statue unveiling ceremony ==
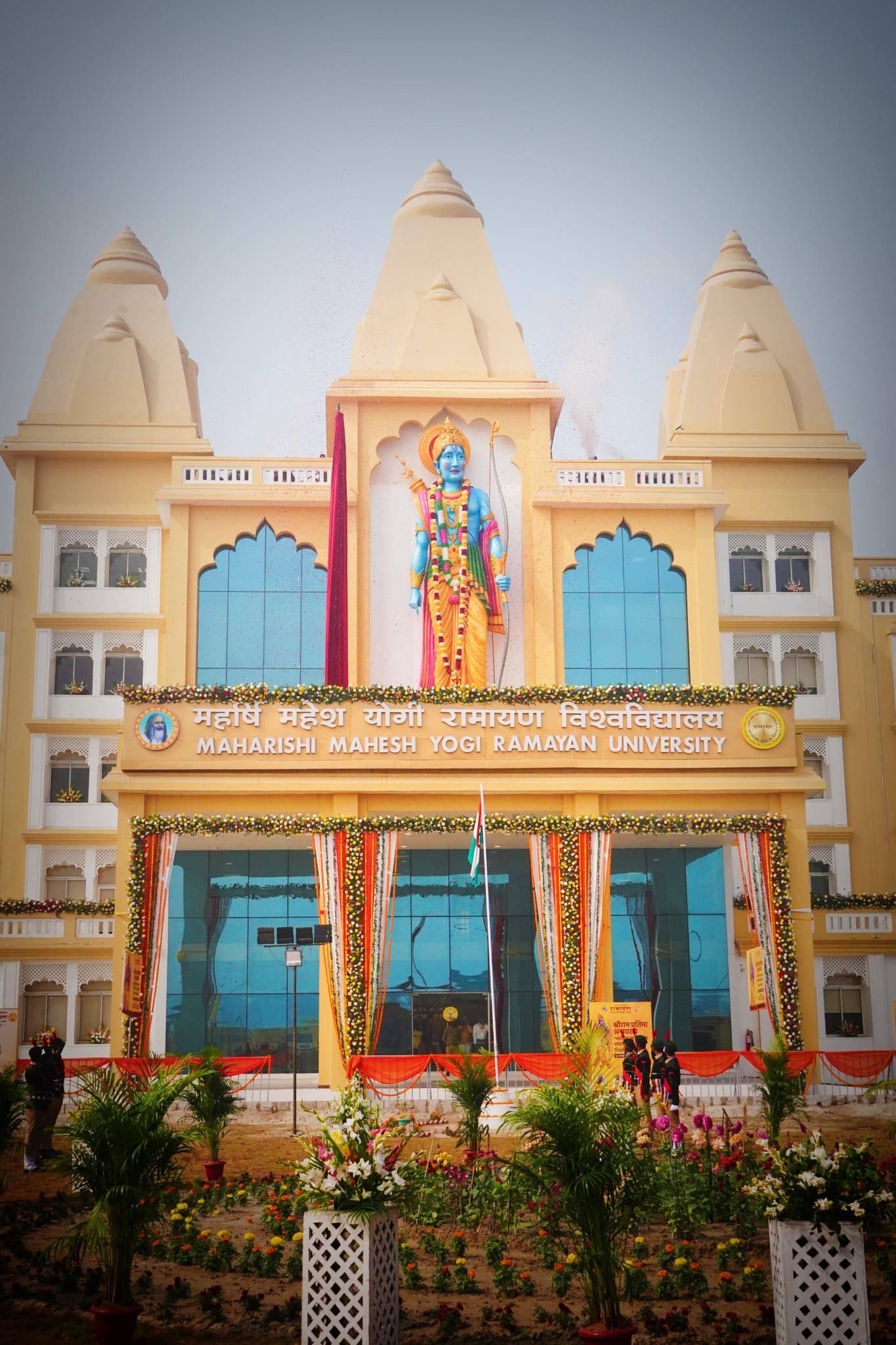

On the occasion of the 109th birth anniversary of Maharishi Mahesh Yogi, a 35-foot-tall statue of Maryada Purushottam Lord Rama was unveiled at the campus of Maharishi Mahesh Yogi Ramayan University. The Governor of Uttar Pradesh, Anandiben Patel, attended the ceremony as the chief guest and formally unveiled the statue. During her address, she described Ayodhya as an eternal symbol of the ideals of Ram Rajya. The event was attended by university officials, academicians, and other dignitaries.

== See also ==
- Maharishi Mahesh Yogi
- Transcendental Meditation
- Maharishi University of Information Technology
- Transcendental Meditation movement
- Global Country of World Peace
- Ramayan
- Ayodhya
- Vedic education
