= Ingegerd Engfelt =

Ingegerd Engfelt (1953–1989) was a Swedish businesswoman who founded Track Tape, a cassette tape company that sought to compete with rival Japanese businesses such as Sony, Maxell, and TDK. After becoming known as the "Cassette Queen" (Kassettbandsdrottningen) of Sweden, the business ultimately failed in 1985.

== Life ==
During her late teens, Engfelt began meditating as it became a trend of the 1960s, joining the TM (Transcendental Meditation) movement where, due to her wealth, she was drawn in to the inner circle of millionaires that surrounded Maharishi Mahesh Yogi. Mahesh gave her the idea to begin a cassette tape business since he wanted his teachings recorded and distributed.

The daughter of William Engfelt, one of the wealthiest men in Malmö, Engfelt inherited 80,000,000 krona and invested everything into the cassette tape business, becoming known as the "Cassette Queen" of Sweden. Despite the factory providing work for underemployed Malmö, the substandard quality of the tapes caused the business to suffer. In 1985, Track Tape went bankrupt and Engfelt became severely depressed. When she made a desperate call to Mahesh, the guru simply hung up the phone in the middle of their call and, according to friend and TM secretary Conny Larsson, Engfelt threw the phone out the window. Engfelt committed suicide in 1989.
