= Sampurna Nagar =

- town
- Location in Uttar Pradesh, India
- Coordinates: 28°35′14″N 80°24′44″E
- Country: India
- State: Uttar Pradesh
- District: Kheri

Government
  - Type: Municipal corporation
  - Body: Nagar Palika

Languages
  - Official: Hindi
- Time zone: UTC+5:30 (IST)

Sampurna Nagar is a town in the Kheri district of Uttar Pradesh, India. The town is home to a sugar mill and is close to Dudhwa National Park.

== Geography ==
Sampurna Nagar is about 12 hours from Delhi by car or train and can be reached from Lucknow by meter gauge trains in about 5 hours. The city is close to the Nepal border, with the Nepali town of Dhangadhi about 25 kilometres (16 mi) by road. There are several schools and colleges in the city, including the Public Inter College (PIC), Kanya Junior School, and Indira Shiksha Niketan.

The river Sharda flows near the city, sometimes causing severe flooding in the city and surrounding areas. Floods are widespread during rainfall. The floods severely affect sugarcane cultivation: the main occupation of farmers in and around the city.

The accessibility of the city is affected by floods which affect the roads connecting the city to Puranpur and Palia Kalan. Train services from Mailani to Palia Kalan are also affected.

== Economy ==
The main occupation in the area is the cultivation of sugarcane, and Sampurna Nagar is home to the Kisan Sehkaari Chini Mill. The local market is mainly run by local shopkeepers which sell daily necessities and goods.

== National park ==
Dudhwa National Park is located adjacent to the town. The park is home to rhinos, tigers, birds, and reptiles.
