= Bob Roth =

American Transcendental Meditation (TM) teacher and author

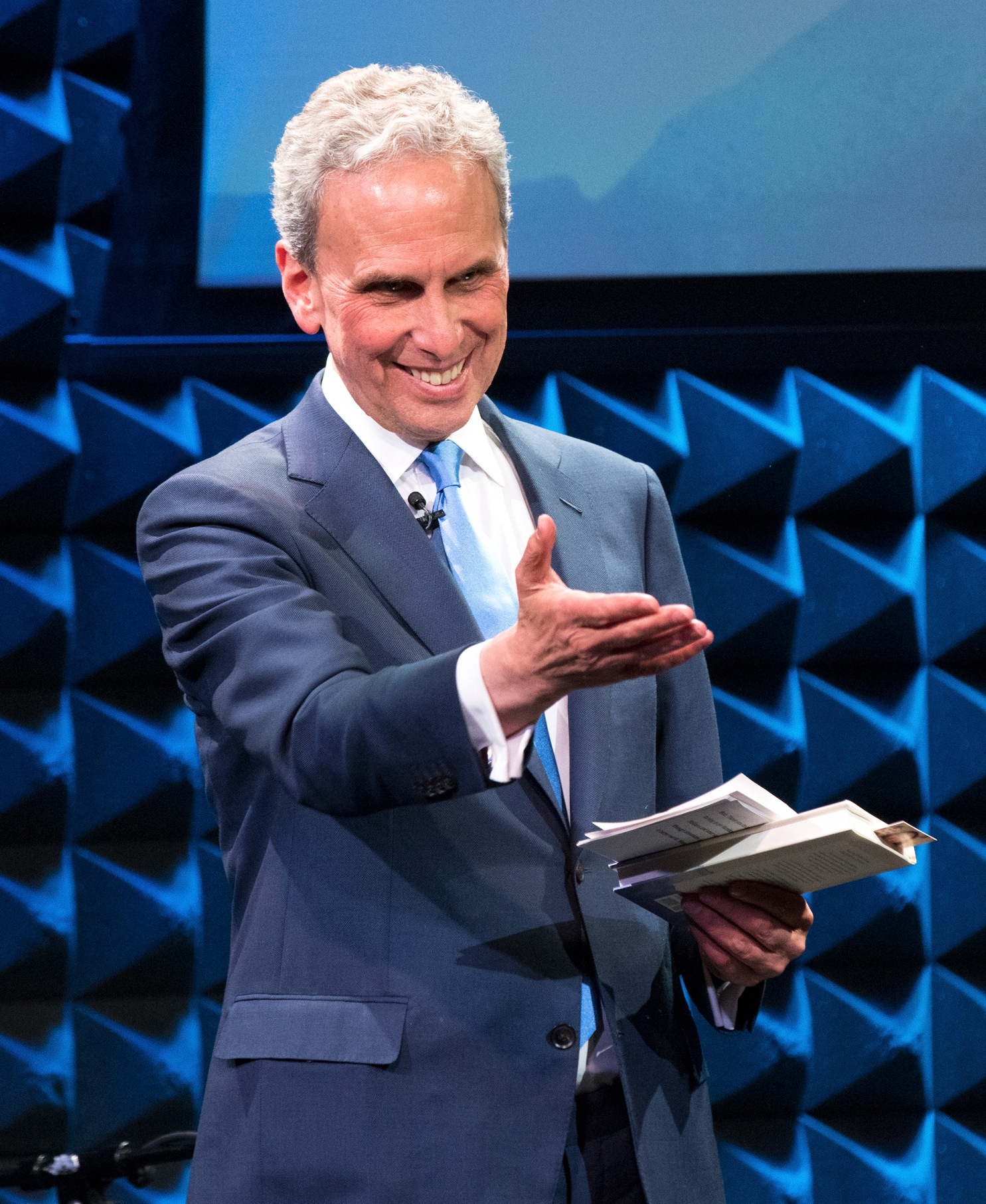
- Born: October 10, 1950 (age 75); Washington, District of Columbia, U.S.
- Education: University of California at Berkeley
- Occupations: Educator, author, meditation teacher
- Known for: Transcendental Meditation teacher
- Parent(s): Merall and Susan Roth

Bob Roth (born October 10, 1950) is an American Transcendental Meditation (TM) teacher and author. He is the CEO of the David Lynch Foundation and a director of the Center for Leadership Performance.

== Early life and education ==
Bob Roth was born in Washington, D.C., U.S.A. He is the son of Dr. Merall Roth, a radiologist, and Susan Roth, a teacher. He attended Redwood High School in Larkspur, California, and graduated from the University of California at Berkeley.

Roth learned TM at the Berkeley TM Center in 1969. In 1972, he took a semester off college to travel to Spain and study with Maharishi Mahesh Yogi. After six months of study, Roth became a TM teacher himself.

== Career ==
Roth is the CEO of the David Lynch Foundation and has taught TM for nearly 50 years. His students include thousands of at-risk students in underserved schools, military veterans, women and children who have experienced domestic violence, and numerous celebrities like Tom Hanks, Oprah Winfrey, Hugh Jackman, Martin Scorsese, Katy Perry, Russell Brand, and others. Roth is the author of Maharishi Mahesh Yogi's Transcendental Meditation and the 2018 New York Times bestseller Strength in Stillness: The Power of Transcendental Meditation.

== Personal life ==
Roth resides in New York, N.Y. He has three siblings: his sister, Ellen, and brothers Bill and Tom. Having grown up in the San Francisco Bay Area, Roth is a fan of the San Francisco Giants and Golden State Warriors. He idolized Willie Mays in his youth and is a big fan of Stephen Curry today.

== Awards ==
In 2015, Roth was the recipient of the Disruptor Award from the Tribeca Disruptive Innovation Awards for David Lynch Foundation's innovative work serving at-risk populations.

== Publications and works ==
- Maharishi Mahesh Yogi's Transcendental Meditation. Plume, 1988. 978–1556110856
- The Natural Law Party: A Reason to Vote. St. Martin's Press. 1998. ISBN 978-0-312-24316-6.
- Strength in Stillness: The Power of Transcendental Meditation. Simon & Schuster, 2018. 978–1501161216
