= Ramayanam Sarveswara Sastry =

Indian stage actor (1889–1962)

- Born: 1889; Bheemasingi, Vizianagaram District
- Died: 1 October 1962 (aged 72–73); Anakapalli
- Occupation: Stage Actor
- Years active: 1910–1960

Ramayanam Sarveswara Sastry (1889 – 1 October 1962) was a stage actor.

He was born in Bheemasingi village in Vizianagaram district, Andhra Pradesh. His parents were Laxminarasimha Sastry, a pundit known as "Abhinava Bheemakavi" and Venkata Subbamma. His ancestors used to recite Hindu epic Ramayanam in the village regularly which garnered their family the name of Ramayanam.

Sastry completed his schooling in Rippon High School at Vizianagaram. He had a passion of playing dramas since childhood, hence, joined Vizianagram Amateur Theatrical Society in 1910 and played different roles till 1919. Later, he joined the Vijayarama Dramatic Academy of Vizianagaram Kingdom and was a part of it until, 1935. He also worked as a teacher in Branch College till 1947.

He played many characters on stage including: Rajasimha in Rasaputra Vijayam, Ramadas in Ramadasu, Srikrishna in Prasanna Yadavam, Pandavodyogam and Padmavyooham, Gayudu in Gayopakhyanam, Rustum in Vijayanagara Samrajya Patanam, Harischandra in Harischandra, Arjuna in Krishna Rayabaram, Nala in Chitra Naleeyam, Bilvamangal in Chintamani and Hiranyakashipu.

He has toured Madras and Machilipatnam in 1928 and portrayed many Ramadasu and Harischandra characters. He got about 20 medals from the different Zamindars.

He died on 1 October 1962 at Anakapalli.
