= Sampoorna Ramayana (disambiguation) =

Sampoorna Ramayana is a 1961 Hindi film made by director Babubhai Mistry.

Sampoorna Ramayana (transl. The Complete Ramayana) may also refer to:

- Sampoorna Ramayanam (1958 film), a 1958 Tamil film directed by K. Somu
- Sampoorna Ramayanam (1971 film), a 1971 Telugu film directed by Bapu

== See also ==
- Ramayana (disambiguation)
