= Maharishi Mahesh Yogi =

Indian guru (1911?–2008)

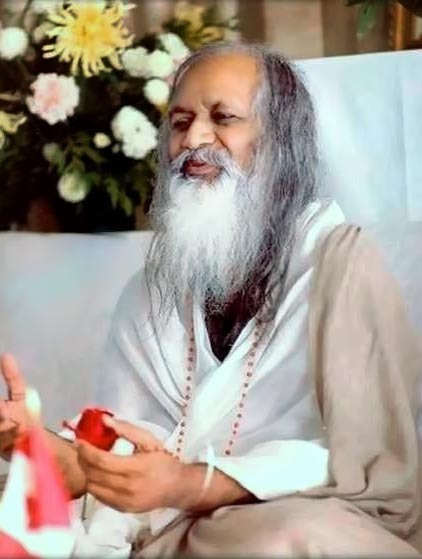
- Maharishi Mahesh Yogi in 1978

Personal life
- Born: Mahesh Prasad Varma; 12 January 1911? (Note: Maharishi Mahesh Yogi's year of birth is uncertain, as various sources claim 1911, 1917, or 1918.) Rajim, Central Provinces and Berar, British India (present-day Chhattisgarh, India)
- Died: 5 February 2008 (aged 90–97) Vlodrop, Limburg, Netherlands
- Honours: Maharishi

Religious life
- Religion: Hinduism
- Founder of: Transcendental Meditation movement; Global Country of World Peace; Maharishi University of Information Technology; Maharishi Mahesh Yogi Ramayan University
- Philosophy: Transcendental Meditation

Religious career
- Teacher: Brahmananda Saraswati

Maharishi Mahesh Yogi (born Mahesh Prasad Varma, 12 January 1911? – 5 February 2008) was the creator of Transcendental Meditation (TM) and leader of the worldwide organization that has been characterized in multiple ways, including as a new religious movement and as non-religious. He became known as Maharishi (meaning "great seer") and Yogi as an adult.

After earning a degree in physics at Allahabad University in 1942, Maharishi Mahesh Yogi became an assistant and disciple of Swami Brahmananda Saraswati (also known as Guru Dev), the Shankaracharya (spiritual leader) of the Jyotir Math in the Indian Himalayas. The Maharishi credits Brahmananda Saraswati with inspiring his teachings. In 1955, the Maharishi began to introduce his Transcendental Deep Meditation (later renamed Transcendental Meditation) to India and the world. His first global tour began in 1958. His devotees referred to him as His Holiness, and because he laughed frequently in early TV interviews, he was sometimes referred to as the "giggling guru."

The Maharishi trained more than 40,000 TM teachers, taught the Transcendental Meditation technique to "more than five million people" and founded thousands of teaching centres and hundreds of colleges, universities and schools, while TM websites report that tens of thousands have learned the TM-Sidhi programme. His initiatives include schools and universities with campuses in several countries, including India, Canada, the United States, the United Kingdom and Switzerland. The Maharishi, his family and close associates created charitable organisations and for-profit businesses, including alternative medicine health clinics (Maharishi Vedic Approach to Health), mail-order ayurveda health supplement stores, and organic farms. The reported value of the Maharishi's organization has ranged from the millions to billions of U.S. dollars; in 2008, the organization placed the value of their United States assets at about $300 million.

In the late 1960s and early 1970s, the Maharishi achieved fame as the guru to the Beatles, the Beach Boys, and other celebrities. In the late 1970s, he started the TM-Sidhi programme, which includes techniques such as Yogic flying. The Maharishi's Natural Law Party was founded in 1992 and ran campaigns in dozens of countries. He moved to near Vlodrop, the Netherlands, in the same year. In 2000, he created the Global Country of World Peace, a non-profit world government organization, and appointed its leaders (crowned as rajas and majarajas, i.e. "kings" and "great kings"). In 2008, the Maharishi announced his retirement from all administrative activities and went into silence until his death three weeks later.

== Life ==
=== Birth ===
Maharishi Mahesh Yogi belonged to a family of the Kayastha caste. The birth name and the birth dates of Maharishi Mahesh Yogi are not known with certainty, in part because of the tradition of ascetics and monks to relinquish family connections. Many accounts say he was born Mahesh Prasad Varma into a Kayastha family living in the Central Provinces of British India. A different name appears in the Allahabad University list of distinguished alumni, where he is listed as M.C. Srivastava, and an obituary says his name was "Mahesh Srivastava".

Various accounts give the year of his birth as 1911, 1917 or 1918. Authors Paul Mason and William Jefferson say that he was born 12 January 1917 in Rajim, Central Provinces, British India (Chhattisgarh, India). The place of birth given in his passport is "Pounalulla", India, and his birth date 12 January 1918. Mahesh "most likely" came from an upper-caste family of the high-status Kayastha caste, whose traditional profession is writing.

=== Early life ===
Mahesh studied physics at Allahabad University and earned a degree in 1942. While a few sources say that he worked at the Gun Carriage Factory in Jabalpur for some time, most report that in 1941 he became an administrative secretary to the Shankaracharya of the Jyotir Math, Swami Brahmananda Saraswati (also known as Guru Dev, which means "divine teacher") and took a new name, Bal Brahmachari Mahesh. Coplin refers to bala brahmachari as both a title and a name and considers that it "identified him as a fully dedicated student of spiritual knowledge and life-long celibate ascetic." Brahmananda insisted that before accepting Mahesh as a pupil he must first complete his university degree and get permission from his parents. The Maharishi recalls how it took about two and a half years to attune himself to the thinking of Brahmananda Saraswati and to gain "a very genuine feeling of complete oneness". At first Brahmachari Mahesh performed common chores but gained trust and became Guru Dev's "personal secretary" and "favored pupil". He was trusted to take care of the bulk of Swami Brahmananda Saraswati's correspondence without direction and was also sent out to give public speeches on Vedic (scriptural) themes. The Maharishi said his life truly began in 1940, at the feet of his master, when he learned the secret of swift and deep meditation.

Brahmachari Mahesh remained with Swami Brahmananda Saraswati until the latter died in 1953, when he moved to Uttarkashi in Uttarakhand in the Himalayas, where he undertook a reclusive life for two years. Although Brahmachari Mahesh was a close disciple, he could not be the Shankaracharya's spiritual successor, because he was not a Brahmin. The Shankaracharya, at the end of his life, charged him with the responsibility of travelling and teaching meditation to the masses, while he named Swami Shantananda Saraswati as his successor.

=== Tour in India (1955–1957) ===
In 1955, Brahmachari Mahesh left Uttarkashi and began publicly teaching what he stated was a traditional meditation technique learned from his master Brahmananda Saraswati, and that he called Transcendental Deep Meditation. Later the technique was renamed Transcendental Meditation. It was also then that he was first publicly known with the name "Maharishi", an honorific title meaning "great sage", after the title was given to him according to some sources from "Indian Pundits"; according to another source the honorific was given along with Yogi by followers in India. Later in the west, the title was retained as a name.

He travelled around India for two years interacting with his "Hindu audiences" in an "Indian context". At that time, he called his movement the Spiritual Development Movement, but renamed it the Spiritual Regeneration Movement in 1957, in Madras, on the concluding day of the Seminar of Spiritual Luminaries. According to Coplin, in his visits to southern India, the Maharishi spoke English rather than the Hindi spoken in his home area to avoid provoking resistance among those seeking linguistic self-determination, and to appeal to the "learned classes".

=== World tours (1958–1968) ===
According to William Jefferson, in 1958, the Maharishi went to Madras to address a large crowd of people who had gathered to celebrate the memory of Guru Dev. It was there that he spontaneously announced that he planned to spread the teaching of TM throughout the world. Hundreds of people immediately asked to learn TM. In 1959, Maharishi Mahesh Yogi began his first world tour, writing: "I had one thing in mind, that I know something which is useful to every man".

The Maharishi's 1986 book, Thirty Years Around the World, gives a detailed account of his world tours, as do two biographies, The Story of the Maharishi, by William Jefferson, and The Maharishi by Paul Mason. The first world tour began in Rangoon, Burma (now Myanmar), and included the countries of Thailand, Malaya, Singapore, Hong Kong and Hawaii. He arrived in Hawaii in the spring of 1959, and the Honolulu Star Bulletin reported: "He has no money, he asks for nothing. His worldly possessions can be carried in one hand. Maharishi Mahesh Yogi is on a world odyssey. He carries a message that he says will rid the world of all unhappiness and discontent." In 1959, the Maharishi lectured and taught the Transcendental Meditation technique in Honolulu, San Francisco, Los Angeles, Boston, New York and London. While in Los Angeles, the Maharishi stayed at the home of author Helena Olson, and during this period he developed a three-year plan to propagate Transcendental Meditation to the whole world. Though most of his audience consisted of average middle class individuals, he also attracted a few celebrities, such as Efrem Zimbalist Jr., Nancy Cooke de Herrera and Doris Duke.

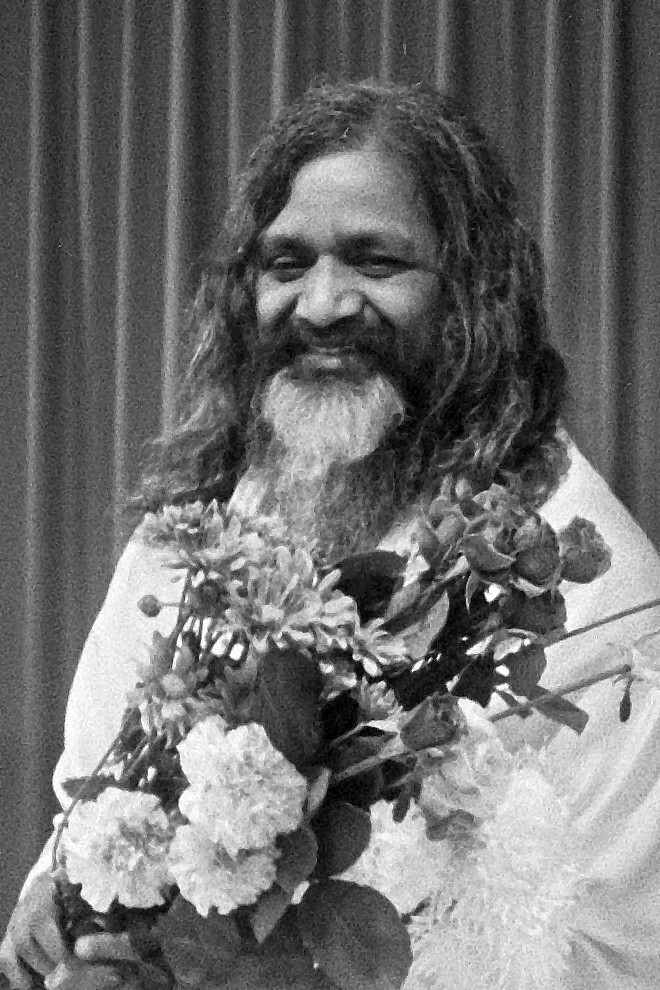
Maharishi Mahesh Yogi in 1967 in The Netherlands at Concertgebouw (Amsterdam)

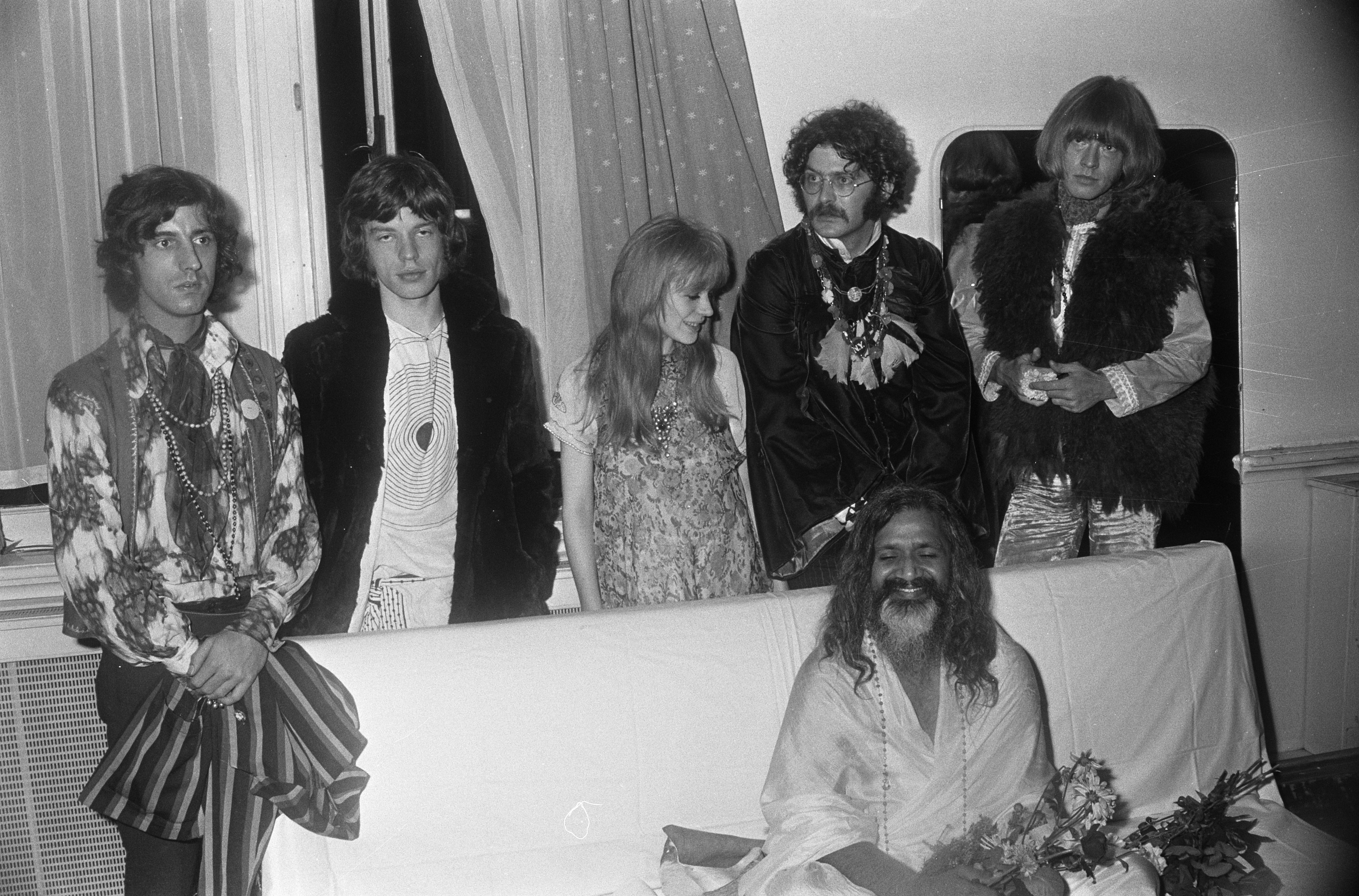
Left to right: Michael Cooper, Mick Jagger, Marianne Faithfull, Shepard Sherbell, and Brian Jones; sitting: Maharishi Mahesh Yogi (Concertgebouw Amsterdam, 1967)

When the Maharishi came to the U.S. in 1959, his Spiritual Regeneration Movement was called Transcendental Meditation. That same year, he began the International Meditation Society and other organizations to propagate his teachings, establishing centres in San Francisco and London. For years, the sole teacher of Transcendental Meditation in America was a San Diego woman named Beulah Smith.

In 1960, the Maharishi traveled to many cities in India, France, Switzerland, England, Scotland, Norway, Sweden, Germany, the Netherlands, Italy, Singapore, Australia, New Zealand, and Africa.

While in Manchester, England, the Maharishi gave a television interview and was featured in many English newspapers, such as the Birmingham Post, the Oxford Mail and the Cambridge Daily News. This was also the year in which the Maharishi trained Henry Nyburg to be the first Transcendental Meditation teacher in Europe.

In 1961, the Maharishi visited the United States, Austria, Sweden, France, Italy, Greece, India, Kenya, England, and Canada. While in England, he appeared on BBC television and gave a lecture to 5,000 people at the Royal Albert Hall in London, organised by Leon MacLaren of the School of Economic Science. In April 1961, the Maharishi conducted his first Transcendental Meditation Teacher Training Course in Rishikesh, India, with sixty participants from various countries. Teachers continued to be trained as time progressed. During the course, the Maharishi began to introduce additional knowledge regarding the development of human potential and began writing his translation and commentary on the first six chapters of the ancient Vedic text, the Bhagavad Gita.

His 1962 world tour included visits to Europe, India, Australia and New Zealand. In Britain, he founded a branch of the Spiritual Regeneration Movement. The year concluded in California, where the Maharishi began dictating his book The Science of Being and Art of Living. In Rishikesh, India, beginning on 20 April 1962, a forty-day course was held for "sadhus, sanyasis, and brahmacharis" to introduce TM to "religious preachers and spiritual masters in India".

The Maharishi toured cities in Europe, Asia, North America and India in 1963, and also addressed ministers of the Indian Parliament. According to his memoirs, twenty-one members of parliament then issued a public statement endorsing the Maharishi's goals and meditation technique. His Canadian tour was also well covered by the press.

The Maharishi's fifth world tour, in 1964, consisted of visits to many cities in North America, Europe and India. During his visit to England, he appeared with the Abbot of Downside, Abbot Butler, on a BBC television show called The Viewpoint. In October of that year, in California, the Maharishi began teaching the first Advanced Technique of Transcendental Meditation to some experienced meditators. While travelling in America, the Maharishi met with Robert Maynard Hutchins, the head of the Center for the Study of Democratic Institutions, and U Thant, the Secretary General of the United Nations. During this same year, the Maharishi finished his book The Science of Being and Art of Living, which sold more than a million copies and was published in fifteen languages.

The Maharishi's activities in 1966 included a course in India and a one-month tour in South America. He established Transcendental Meditation centers in Port of Spain, Trinidad; Caracas, Venezuela; Rio de Janeiro, Brazil; Porto Alegre, Brazil; Buenos Aires, Argentina; Santiago, Chile; Lima, Peru; and Bogota, Colombia.

In addition, in 1966 the Maharishi founded the Students' International Meditation Society ("SIMS"), which The Los Angeles Times later characterised as a "phenomenal success". In the 1970s, SIMS centres were established at "over one thousand campuses", including Harvard University, Yale University, and UCLA.

In 1967, the Maharishi gave a lecture at Caxton Hall in London, which was attended by Leon MacLaren, the founder and leader of the School of Economic Science (SES). He also lectured at UCLA, Harvard, Yale and Berkeley. That year, an article in Time magazine reported that the Maharishi "has been sharply criticised by other Indian sages, who complain that his programme for spiritual peace without either penance or asceticism contravenes every traditional Hindu belief". Religion and culture scholar Sean McCloud also reported that traditional Indian sages and gurus were critical of the Maharishi for teaching a simple technique and making it available to everyone and for abandoning traditional concepts of suffering and concentration as paths to enlightenment. At the end of 1968, the Maharishi said that after ten years of teaching and world tours, he would return to India.

=== Association with the Beatles ===
In 1967, the Maharishi's fame increased and his movement gained greater prominence when he became the "spiritual advisor to the Beatles", though he was already well known among young people in the UK and had already had numerous public appearances that brought him to the band's attention. Following the Beatles' endorsement of TM, during 1967 and 1968 the Maharishi appeared on American magazine covers such as Life, Newsweek, Time and many others. He gave lectures to capacity crowds at the Felt Forum in New York City and Harvard's Sanders Hall. He also appeared on The Tonight Show and the Today TV shows.

He and the Beatles met in London in August 1967, when George Harrison and his wife Pattie Boyd urged their friends to attend the Maharishi's lecture at the Hilton on Park Lane. The band members went to study with the Maharishi in Bangor, Wales, before travelling to Rishikesh, India, in February 1968 to "devote themselves fully to his instruction". Ringo Starr and his wife Maureen left after 10 days. The group's most dedicated students, George Harrison and John Lennon, departed with their wives 16 days later and Paul McCartney and Jane Asher left after five weeks.

During their stay, the Beatles heard that the Maharishi had allegedly made sexual advances towards Mia Farrow. On 15 June 1968, in London, the Beatles formally renounced their association with the Maharishi as a "public mistake". "Sexy Sadie" is the title of a song Lennon wrote in response to the episode. Lennon originally wanted to title the song "Maharishi", but changed the title at Harrison's request. Harrison commented years later, "Now, historically, there's the story that something went on that shouldn't have done – but nothing did." In 1992, Harrison gave a benefit concert for the Maharishi-associated Natural Law Party and later apologised for the way the Maharishi had been treated, by saying, "We were very young" and "It's probably in the history books that Maharishi 'tried to attack Mia Farrow' – but it's bullshit, total bullshit." Cynthia Lennon wrote in 2006 that she "hated leaving on a note of discord and mistrust, when we had enjoyed so much kindness from the Maharishi". Asked if he forgave the Beatles, the Maharishi replied, "I could never be upset with angels." McCartney took his daughter Stella to visit the Maharishi in the Netherlands in 2007, which renewed their friendship.

The New York Times and The Independent reported that the influence of the Maharishi, and the journey to Rishikesh to meditate, steered the Beatles away from LSD and inspired them to write many new songs. In 2009, McCartney commented that Transcendental Meditation was a gift the Beatles had received from the Maharishi at a time when they were looking for something to stabilise them. The Beatles' visit to the Maharishi's ashram coincided with a thirty-participant Transcendental Meditation teacher training course that was ongoing when they arrived. Graduates of the course included Prudence Farrow and Mike Love.

Although the Rishikesh ashram had thrived in its early days, it was eventually abandoned in 2001. By 2016, some of it had been reclaimed with building repairs, cleared paths, a small photo museum, murals, a cafe and charges for visitors, although the site remains essentially a ruin.

=== Further growth of the TM movement (1968–1990) ===
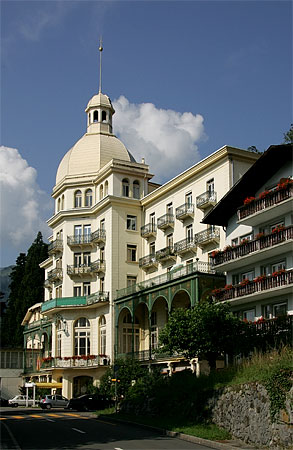
The Maharishi's headquarters in Seelisberg, Switzerland

In 1968, the Maharishi announced that he would stop his public activities and instead begin the training of TM teachers at his new global headquarters in Seelisberg, Switzerland. In 1969, he inaugurated a course in his Science of Creative Intelligence at Stanford University, which was then offered at 25 other American universities.

In 1970, the Maharishi held a TM teacher training course at a Victorian hotel in Poland Springs, Maine, with 1,200 participants. Later that year, he held a similar four-week course with 1500 participants at Humboldt State College in Arcata, California. In 1970, after having trouble with Indian tax authorities, he moved his headquarters to Italy, returning to India in the late 1970s. That same year, the City of Hope Foundation in Los Angeles gave the Maharishi their "Man of Hope" award.

By 1971, the Maharishi had completed 13 world tours, visited 50 countries, and held a press conference with American inventor Buckminster Fuller at his first International Symposium on SCI at the University of Massachusetts in Amherst, Massachusetts. From 1970 to 1973, about 10,000 people attended the Maharishi sponsored symposia on his modern interpretation of Vedanta philosophy, called Science of Creative Intelligence. During these conferences, held at universities, the Maharishi spoke with "leading thinkers" of the day, such as Hans Selye, Marshall McLuhan, and Jonas Salk.

The Maharishi announced his World Plan in 1972, the goal of which was to establish 3,600 TM centres around the world. That year, a TM training course was given by the Maharishi at Queen's University and was attended by 1,000 young people from the US and Canada. At the start of the course, the Maharishi encouraged the attendees to improve their appearance by getting haircuts and wearing ties. He also persuaded the U.S. Army to offer courses in TM to its soldiers and made videotaped recordings of what was thought to be the West's first comprehensive recitation of the Rig Veda.

In March 1973, the Maharishi addressed the legislature of the state of Illinois. That same year, the legislature passed a resolution in support of the use of Maharishi's Science of Creative Intelligence in Illinois public schools. Later that year, he organized a world conference of mayors in Switzerland. In that same year, he also addressed 3000 educators at an American Association of Higher Education (AAHE) conference on quality of life and higher education.

In 1974, Maharishi International University was founded at the site of the former Parsons College in Fairfield, Iowa. In October 1975, the Maharishi was pictured on the front cover of Time magazine. He made his last visit to the Spiritual Regeneration Movement centre in Los Angeles in 1975, according to film director David Lynch, who met him for the first time there.

In 1975, the Maharishi embarked on a five-continent trip to inaugurate what he called "the Dawn of the Age of Enlightenment". The Maharishi said the purpose of the inaugural tour was to "go around the country and give a gentle whisper to the population". He visited Ottawa during this tour and had a private meeting with Canadian prime minister Pierre Trudeau, during which he spoke about the principles of TM and "the possibility of structuring an ideal society". That same year, the Pittsburgh Press reported that "The Maharishi has been criticised by other Eastern yogis for simplifying their ancient art." The Maharishi appeared as a guest on The Merv Griffin Show in 1975 and again in 1977, and this resulted in "tens of thousands of new practitioners" around the USA.

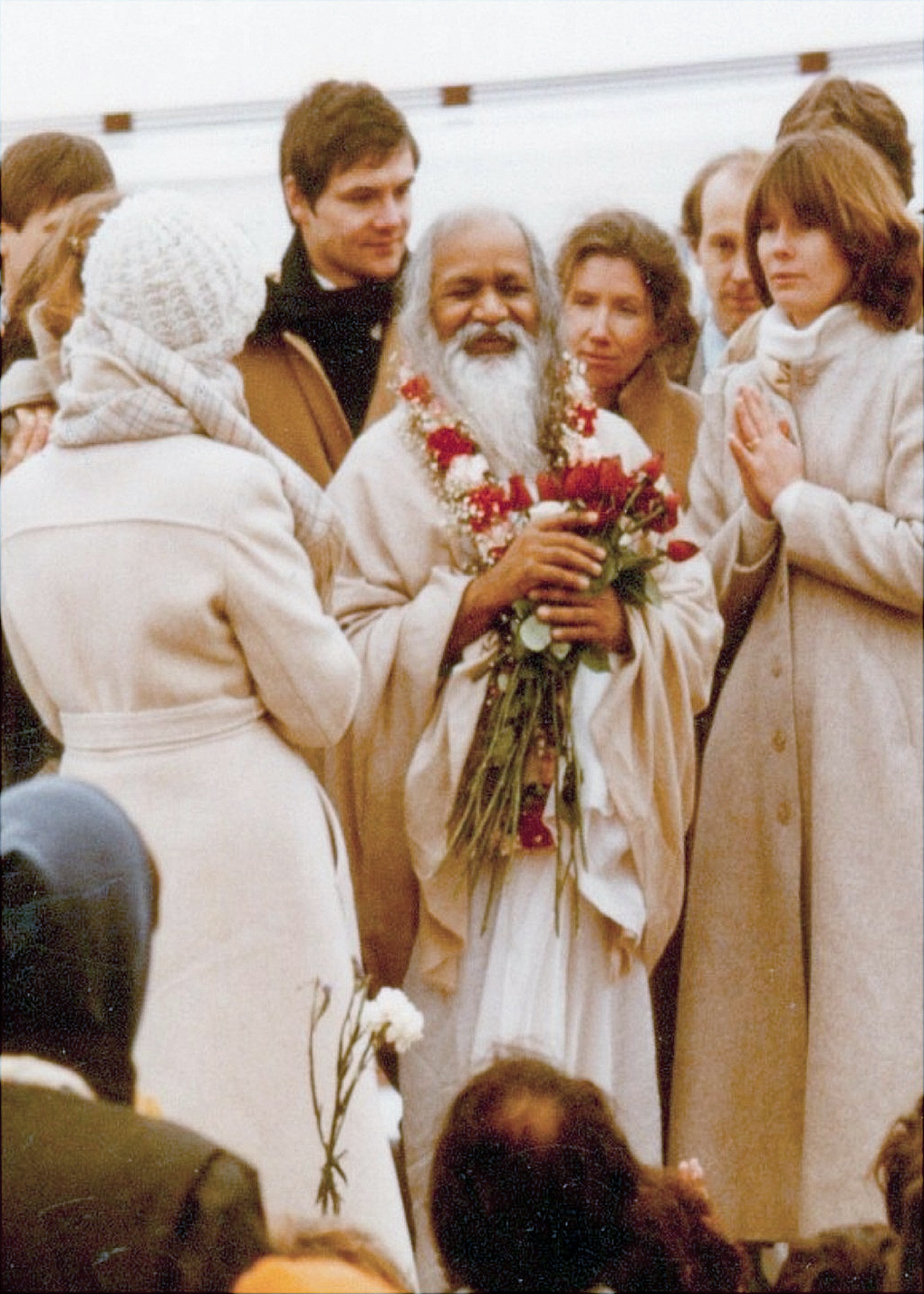
The Maharishi during a 1979 visit to Maharishi University of Management in Fairfield, Iowa

In the mid 1970s, the Maharishi's U.S. movement was operating 370 TM centres staffed by 6,000 TM teachers. At that time, the Maharishi also began approaching the business community via an organisation called the American Foundation for SCI (AFSCI), whose objective was to eliminate stress for business professionals. His TM movement came to be increasingly structured along the lines of a multinational corporation.

The teaching of TM and the Science of Creative Intelligence in a New Jersey public school was stopped when a US court, in 1977, declared the movement to be religious, and ruled adoption of TM by public organisations to be in breach of the separation of church and state (First Amendment).

During the 1980s, the organisation continued to expand and his meditation technique continued to attract celebrities, despite its "outlandish claims" and accusations of fraud from disaffected former disciples. The TM organization made a number of property investments, buying a former Rothschild mansion in England, Mentmore Towers in Buckinghamshire, Roydon Hall in Maidstone, Swythamley Park in the Peak District, and a Georgian rectory in Suffolk. In the United States, resorts and hotels, many in city centres, were purchased to be used as TM training centres. Doug Henning and the Maharishi planned a magical Vedic amusement park, Vedaland, and bought large tracts of land near Orlando, Florida, and Niagara Falls, Ontario, to host the park. The theme park was supposed to be a gateway into understanding the mysteries of the universe. According to the Maharishi's official Vedic city website, "Entering Veda Land through a secret cave on a windswept plateau high in the Himalayas the adventure starts as one travels through a waterfall that leads to a forest where an ancient Vedic civilization awaits to reveal the deepest secrets of the universe (sic)". These plans were never executed and, for Niagara Falls, Veda Land turned out to be just another theme park proposal that never materialized, joining an eclectic list that includes the Worlds of Jules Verne, the Ancient Chinese City and even Canada's Wonderland when it was first being planned. The Maharishi commissioned plans from a prominent architect for the world's tallest building, a Vedic-style pyramid to be built in São Paulo, Brazil, and to be filled with Yogic Flyers and other TM endeavours. The Maharishi founded Maharishi Ved Vigyan Vishwa Vidyapeetham, a self-described educational institution located in Uttar Pradesh, India, in 1982. The institution reports that it has trained 50,000 pundits in traditional Vedic recitation. In 1983, the Maharishi invited government leaders to interact with his organization called "World Government". During the 1980s, the Maharishi planned to distribute his teachings via cassette tapes, encouraging Swedish TM practitioner Ingegerd Engfelt to found Track Tape towards this end, but after Track went bankrupt the Maharishi cut ties with Engfelt.

In January 1988, offices at the Maharishinagar complex in New Delhi were raided by Indian tax authorities, and the Maharishi and his organisation were accused of falsifying expenses. Reports on the value of stocks, fixed-deposit notes, cash and jewels confiscated vary from source to source. The Maharishi, who was "headquartered in Switzerland" at the time, reportedly moved to the Netherlands "after the Indian government accused him of tax fraud".) Following an earthquake in Armenia, the Maharishi trained Russian TM teachers and set up a Maharishi Ayurveda training centre in the Urals region. Beginning in 1989, the Maharishi's movement began incorporating the term "Maharishi" into the names of their new and existing entities, concepts and programmes.

=== Years in Vlodrop (1991–2008) ===
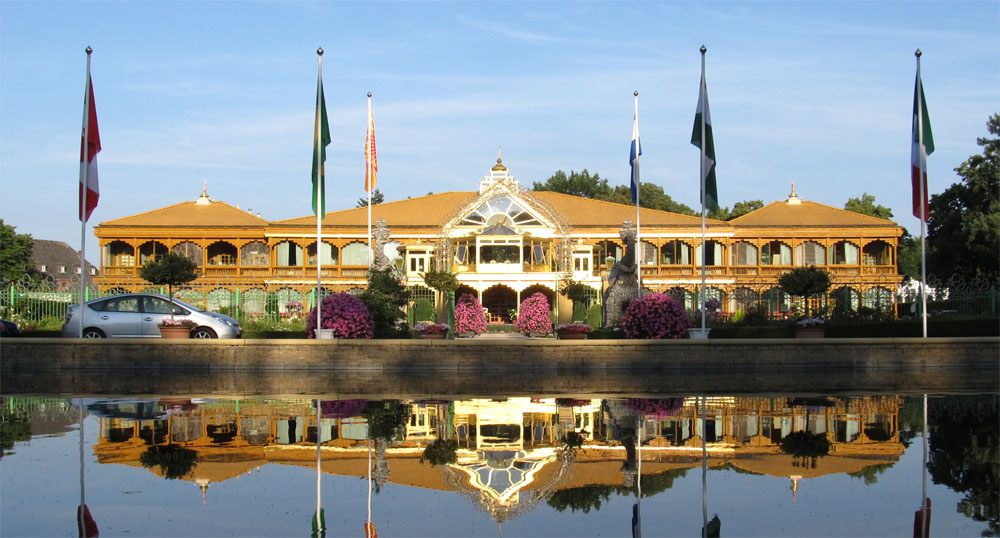
The Maharishi's headquarters in MERU, The Netherlands

In 1990, the Maharishi relocated his headquarters from Seelisberg, Switzerland, to a former Franciscan monastery in Vlodrop, the Netherlands, which became known as MERU, Holland, on account of the Maharishi European Research University (MERU) campus there. During his time in Vlodrop, he communicated to the public mainly via video and the internet. He also created a subscription-based, satellite TV channel, called Veda Vision, which broadcast content in 22 languages and 144 countries.

In 1991, the Maharishi called Washington, D.C. a "pool of mud" after a decade of attempts to lower the rate of crime in the city, which had the second-largest TM community in the US. He told his followers to leave and save themselves from its "criminal atmosphere". The Maharishi is believed to have made his final public appearance in 1991, in Maastricht, the Netherlands. Deepak Chopra, described as "one of the Maharishi's top assistants before he launched his own career", wrote that the Maharishi collapsed in 1991 with kidney and pancreas failure, that the illness was kept secret by the Maharishi's family, and that he tended to Maharishi during a year-long recovery. According to Chopra, the Maharishi accused him, in July 1993, of trying to compete for the position of guru and asked him to stop travelling and writing books, which led to Chopra's decision to leave the movement in January 1994.

As part of a world plan for peace, the Maharishi inaugurated the Natural Law Party (NLP), calling it a "natural government". His adherents founded the NLP in 1992. It was active in forty-two countries. John Hagelin, the NLP's three-time candidate for U.S. president, denied any formal connection between the Maharishi and the party. According to spokesman Bob Roth, "The Maharishi has said the party has to grow to encompass everyone." Critics charged that the party was an effort to recruit people for Transcendental Meditation, and that it resembled "the political arm of an international corporation" more than a "home-grown political creation". The Indian arm of the NLP, the Ajeya Bharat Party, achieved electoral success, winning one seat in a state assembly in 1998. The Maharishi shut down the political effort in 2004, saying, "I had to get into politics to know what is wrong there."

In 1992, the Maharishi began to send groups of Yogic Flyers to countries like India, Brazil, China and the United States of America in an effort to promote world peace through "coherent world consciousness". In 1993 and 2003, he decided to raise the fees for learning the TM technique.

In 1997, the Maharishi's organization built the largest wooden structure in the Netherlands without using any nails. The building was the Maharishi's residence for the last two decades of his life. In later years, the Maharishi rarely left his two-room quarters in order to preserve his health and energy. He used videoconferencing to communicate with the world and with his advisors. Built to Maharishi Sthapatya Veda architectural standards, the structure, according to the Maharishi, is said to have helped him infuse "the light of Total Knowledge" into "the destiny of the human race".

In 2000, the Maharishi founded the Global Country of World Peace (GCWP) "to create global world peace by unifying all nations in happiness, prosperity, invincibility and perfect health, while supporting the rich diversity of our world family". The Maharishi crowned Tony Nader, a physician and MIT-trained neuroscientist, as the king or Maharaja of the GCWP in 2000. The GCWP unsuccessfully attempted to establish a sovereign micronation when it offered US$1.3 billion to the President of Suriname for a 200-year lease of 3,500 acres (14 km^{2}) of land and in 2002, attempted to choose a king for the Talamanca, a "remote Indian reservation" in Costa Rica.

In 2001, Maharishi University Of Information Technology was founded at Lucknow, Uttar Pradesh India.

In 2001, followers of the Maharishi founded Maharishi Vedic City a few miles north of Fairfield, Iowa, in the United States. This new city requires that the construction of its homes and buildings be done according to the Maharishi Sthapatya Veda principles of "harmony with nature".

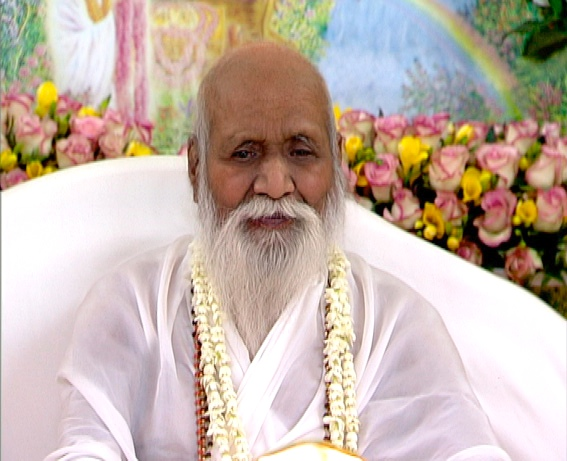
The Maharishi in 2007

In a 2002 appearance on the CNN show, Larry King Live, the first time in 25 years that the Maharishi had appeared in the mainstream media, he said "Transcendental Meditation is something that can be defined as a means to do what one wants to do in a better way, a right way, for maximum results". It was occasioned by the reissue of the Maharishi's book The Science of Being and Art of Living. That same year, the Maharishi Global Financing Research Foundation issued the "Raam" as a currency "dedicated to financing peace promoting projects".

In 2003, David Lynch began a fundraising project to raise US$1 billion "on behalf of Maharishi Mahesh Yogi" to build a meditation centre large enough to hold 8,000 skilled practitioners.

The Maharishi ordered a suspension of TM training in Britain in 2005 due to his opposition to prime minister Tony Blair's decision to support the Iraq War. The Maharishi said that he did not want to waste the "beautiful nectar" of TM on a "scorpion nation". He lifted the ban after Blair's resignation in 2007. During this period, skeptics were critical of some of the Maharishi's programmes, such as a US$10 trillion plan to end poverty through organic farming in poor countries and a US$1 billion plan to use meditation groups to end conflict.

=== Death ===
Maharishi Mahesh Yogi, concerned about his health, became increasingly secluded in two rooms of his residence. During this period, he rarely had in-person meetings and instead communicated with his followers almost exclusively by closed-circuit television.

On 12 January 2008, the Maharishi declared: "It has been my pleasure at the feet of Guru Dev (Brahmananda Saraswati), to take the light of Guru Dev and pass it on in my environment. Now today, I am closing my designed duty to Guru Dev. And I can only say, 'Live long the world in peace, happiness, prosperity, and freedom from suffering.'"

A week before his death, the Maharishi said that he was "stepping down as leader of the TM movement" and "retreating into silence" and that he planned to spend his remaining time studying "the ancient Indian texts". The Maharishi died peacefully in his sleep of natural causes on 5 February 2008 at his residence in Vlodrop, Netherlands. The cremation and funeral rites were conducted at the Maharishi's Allahabad ashram in India, overlooking the confluence of the Ganges and Yamuna rivers.

The funeral, with state honours, was carried by Sadhana TV station and was presided over by one of the claimants to the seat of Shankaracharya of the North, Swami Vasudevananda Saraswati Maharaj. Indian officials who attended the funeral included central minister Subodh Kant Sahay; Vishwa Hindu Parishad (VHP) leader Ashok Singhal; and former Uttar Pradesh assembly speaker and state BJP leader Keshri Nath Tripathi, as well as top local officials. Also in attendance were thirty-five rajas of the Global Country of World Peace, one-time disciple Sri Sri Ravi Shankar, and David Lynch. A troop of uniformed policemen lowered their arms in salute. The funeral received its status as a state funeral because the Maharishi was a recognised master in the tradition of Advaita Vedanta founded by Shankara.

The Maharishi is survived by a brother and "a number of nephews". One nephew, Girish Chandra Varma, is chairman of the Maharishi Vidya Mandir Schools Group and a "senior functionary of the Transcendental Meditation (TM) movement in India." Other nephews include Prakash Shrivastav, president of Maharishi Vidya Mandir Schools and Anand Shrivastava, chairman of the Maharishi Group.

In its obituary, BBC News reported that the Maharishi's master had bequeathed him "the task of keeping the tradition of Transcendental Meditation alive" and that "the Maharishi's commercial mantras drew criticism from stricter Hindus, but his promises of better health, stress relief and spiritual enlightenment drew devotees from all over the world". Paul McCartney commented, saying that "Whilst I am deeply saddened by his passing, my memories of him will only be joyful ones. He was a great man who worked tirelessly for the people of the world and the cause of unity."

=== Legacy ===
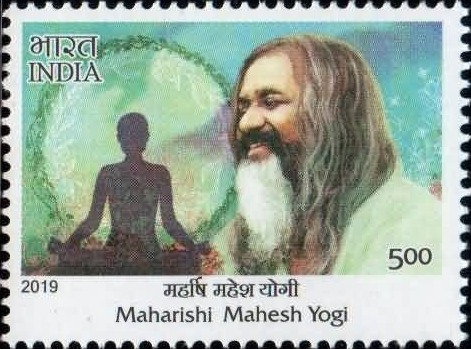
Maharishi Mahesh Yogi on a 2019 stamp of India

The Maharishi left a legacy that includes the revival of India's ancient spiritual tradition of meditation, which he made available to everyone. He is considered responsible for the popularisation of meditation in the west, something he accomplished by teaching Transcendental Meditation worldwide through a highly effective organization of his own development. The Maharishi is also credited with "the proposal of the existence of a unique or fourth state of consciousness with a basis in physiology" and the application of scientific studies to research on the physiological effects of Transcendental Meditation and the development of higher states of consciousness, areas previously relegated to mysticism. Partly because of this, Newsweek credited him with helping to launch "a legitimate new field of neuroscience". According to The Times of India, his "unique and enduring contribution to humankind was his deep understanding of – and mechanics of experiencing – pure consciousness". A memorial building, the Maharishi Smarak, was inaugurated at Allahabad in February 2013.

== Philosophy and teaching ==
The Maharishi had come out to teach with the "avowed intention" to change "the course of human history". When he first began teaching, he had three main aims: to revive the spiritual tradition in India, to show that meditation was for everyone and not just for hermits, and to show that Vedanta is compatible with science. The Maharishi had a message of happiness, writing in 1967 that "being happy is of the utmost importance. Success in anything is through happiness. Under all circumstances be happy. Just think of any negativity that comes at you as a raindrop falling into the ocean of your bliss". His philosophy featured the concept that "within everyone is an unlimited reservoir of energy, intelligence, and happiness". He emphasised the naturalness of his meditation technique as a simple way of developing this potential.

Beginning in 1962, the Maharishi began to recommend the daily practice of yoga exercises or asanas to accelerate growth further.

He also taught that practising Transcendental Meditation twice a day would create inner peace and that "mass meditation sessions" could create outer peace by reducing violence and war. According to a TM website, the performance of yagyas by 7,000 pandits in India, plus hundreds of Yogic Flyers in Germany, brought "coherence and unity in the collective consciousness of Germany" and caused the fall of the Berlin Wall. One religion scholar, Michael York, considers the Maharishi to have been the most articulate spokesman for the spiritual argument that a critical mass of people becoming enlightened through the practice of "meditation and yogic discipline" will trigger the New Age movement's hoped-for period of postmillennial "peace, harmony, and collective consciousness". Religious studies scholar Carl Olson writes that the TM technique was based on "a neo-Vedanta metaphysical philosophy in which an unchanging reality is opposed to an ever-changing phenomenal world" and that the Maharishi says it is not necessary to renounce worldly activities to gain enlightenment, unlike other ascetic traditions.

According to author Jack Forem, the Maharishi stated that the experience of transcendence, which resulted in a naturally increasing refinement of mind and body, enabled people to behave in more correct ways naturally. Thus, behavioral guidelines did not need to be issued and were best left to the teachings of various religions: "It is much easier to raise a man's consciousness than to get him to act righteously," the Maharishi said.

Some religious studies scholars have further said that Maharishi Mahesh Yogi is one of a number of Indian gurus who brought neo-Hindu adaptations of Vedantic Hinduism to the West. Author Meera Nanda calls neo-Hinduism "the brand of Hinduism that is taught by Maharishi Mahesh Yogi, Deepak Chopra, and their clones". J. R. Coplin, a sociologist and MIU graduate, says that the Maharishi saw his own purpose as "the 'revival' of the knowledge of an integrated life based upon Vedic principles and Vedantist reality".

Author Barry Miles writes that, despite the media's skepticism for the Maharishi's spiritual message, they seized upon him because young people seemed to listen to his pro-establishment, anti-drug message, with one TM participant saying the Maharishi "signaled the beginning of the post-acid generation."

=== Transcendental Meditation ===
During a CNN interview in 2002, the Maharishi said, "Transcendental Meditation is something that can be defined as a means to do what one wants to do in a better way, a right way, for maximum results." His movement offered in-residence style TM advanced courses. By the time of his death, there were nearly 1,000 TM training centers around the world.

The Maharishi is credited with having contributed to the Western world a meditation technique that is both simple and systematic, as well as introducing the scientific study of meditation.

In the mid-1970s, the Maharishi began the TM-Sidhi programme, which included Yogic Flying as an additional option for those who had been practicing the Transcendental Meditation technique for some time. According to Coplin, this new aspect of knowledge emphasized not only the individual but also the collective benefits created by the group practice of this advanced program. This new program gave rise to a new principle called the Maharishi Effect, which is said to "create coherence in the collective consciousness" and to suppress crime, violence, and accidents.

=== Maharishi Vedic Science ===
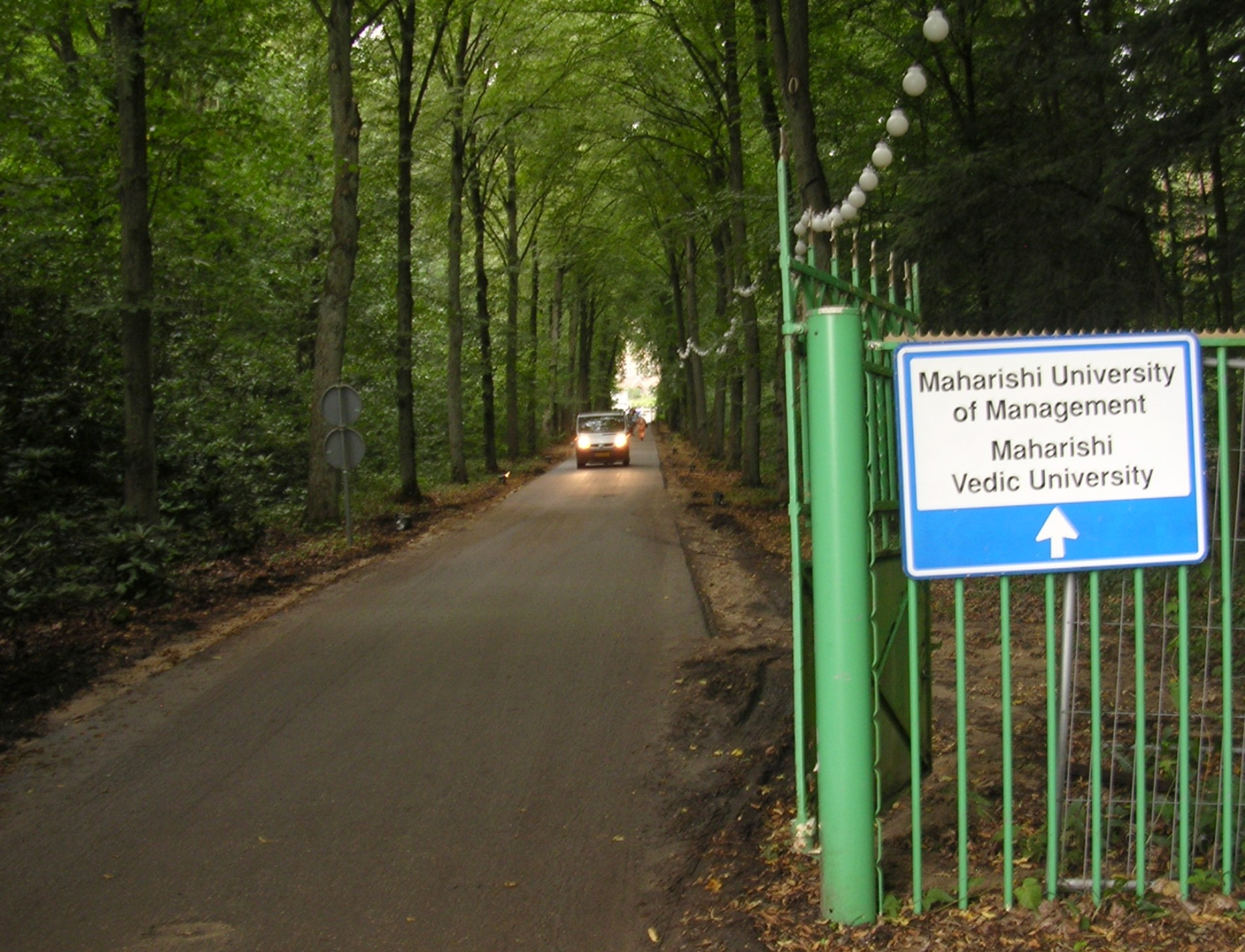
Entrance to the Maharishi University of Management and Maharishi Vedic University campus in Vlodrop, the Netherlands

Maharishi Vedic Science (MVS) is based on the Maharishi's interpretation of the ancient Vedic texts based on his master, Brahmananda Saraswati's teachings. MVS aims to put forward traditional Vedic literature in the light of Western traditions of knowledge and understanding. According to Roy Ascott, MVS also explains the potential for every human being to experience the infinite nature of transcendental consciousness, also defined as Being or Self, while engaged in normal activities of daily life. Once this state is fully established, outer aspects of existence no longer influence an individual and perceives pure consciousness in everything. MVS includes two aspects: the practical aspect of the Transcendental Meditation technique and the TM-Sidhi program and the theoretical aspect of how MVS is applied to day-to-day living. These applications include programs in: Maharishi Vedic Approach to Health (MVAH); Maharishi Sthapatya Veda, a mathematical system for the design and construction of buildings; Maharishi Gandharva Veda, a form of classical Indian music; Maharishi Jyotish (also known as Maharishi Vedic Astrology), a system claiming the evaluation of life tendencies of an individual; Maharishi Vedic Agriculture, a trademarked process for producing fresh, organic food; and Consciousness-Based Education. According to educator James Grant, a former Maharishi University of Management Associate Professor of Education and the former Dean of the College of Arts and Sciences, Maharishi brought out a "full revival of the Vedic tradition of knowledge from India" and demonstrated its relevance in many areas, including education, business, medicine and government.

=== Publications ===
The Maharishi wrote more than twenty books on the Transcendental Meditation technique and Maharishi Vedic Science.

==== The Beacon Light of the Himalayas ====
In 1955, the organizers of the Great Spiritual Development Conference of Kerala published The Beacon Light of the Himalayas, a transcribed 170-page "souvenir" of the conference. Authors Chryssides, Humes and Forsthoefel, Miller, and Russel cite this as the Maharishi's first published book on Transcendental Meditation, but Transcendental Meditation is not mentioned in the book's text. The book is dedicated to Maharshi Bala Brahmachari Mahesh Yogi Rajaram by his devotees of Kerala and contains photographs, letters and lectures by numerous authors, which appear in various languages, such as English, Hindi and Sanskrit.

==== Science of Being and Art of Living ====
In 1963, the Maharishi audiotaped the text of the book Science of Being and Art of Living, which was later transcribed and published in fifteen languages. K.T. Weidmann describes the book as the Maharishi's fundamental philosophical treatise, in which its author provides an illustration of the ancient Vedic traditions of India in terms that can be easily interpreted and understood by the scientific thinking of the Western world. In the Science of Being, the Maharishi illustrates the concepts of relative existence as the experience of everyday reality through one's senses, absolute reality as the origin of being, and the source of all creative intelligence. The Maharishi describes this absolute reality, or Being, as unchanging, omnipresent, and eternal. He also identifies it with bliss consciousness. The two aspects of reality, the relative and the absolute, are like an ocean with many waves. The waves represent the relative, and the ocean beneath is the foundation of everything, or Being. Establishing oneself in the field of Being, or unchanging reality, ensures stability.

In his Science of Being, the Maharishi introduced an additional concept: that of fulfillment viewed as something to be obtained not through exertion or self-effort but through the progressive settling of the mind during the practice of TM. This was the first complete systematic description of the principles underlying the Maharishi's teachings.

==== Bhagavad-Gita: A New Translation and Commentary: 1967 ====
In his 1967 publication, Bhagavad-Gita: A New Translation and Commentary, the Maharishi describes the Bhagavad Gita as "the Scripture of Yoga". He says that "its purpose is to explain in theory and practice all that is needed to raise the consciousness of man to the highest possible level." According to Peter Russell, the Bhagavad-Gita deals with the concept of loss of knowledge and subsequent revival, and the Maharishi himself brings this out in the introduction. In the Preface, the Maharishi writes: "The purpose of this commentary is to restore the fundamental truths of the Bhagavad-Gita and thus restore the significance of its teaching. If this teaching is followed, effectiveness in life will be achieved, men will be fulfilled on all levels and the historical need of the age will be fulfilled also."

A second concept, that of freedom, presented as the antithesis of fear, is also prevalent in the book, according to Jack Forem. Forem states that in his interpretation of the Gita, the Maharishi expressed several times that as man gains greater awareness through the practice of Transcendental Meditation, he gradually establishes a level of contentment which remain increasingly grounded within him and in which the mind does not waver and is not affected by either attachment or fear.

== Characterizations and criticism ==
The Maharishi was reported to be a vegetarian, an entrepreneur, a monk, and "a spiritual man who sought a world stage from which to espouse the joys of inner happiness." He was described as an abstemious man with tremendous energy who took a weekly day of silence while sleeping only two hours per night. He did not present himself as a guru or claim his teachings as his own. Instead, he taught "in the name of his guru Brahmananda Saraswati" and paid tribute to him by placing a picture of Saraswati behind him when he spoke. He was on a mission to bring the ancient techniques of TM to the world. Scientist and futurist Buckminster Fuller spent two days with the Maharishi at a symposium at the University of Massachusetts in 1971 and said, "You could not meet with Maharishi without recognizing instantly his integrity." Authors Douglas E. Cowan and David G. Bromley write that the Maharishi did not claim any "special divine revelation nor supernatural personal qualities". Still others said he helped to "inspire the anti-materialism of the late 60s" and received good publicity because he "opposed drugs". According to author Chryssides, "The Maharishi tended to emphasize the positive aspects of humanity, focusing on the good that exists in everyone."

According to The Times, the Maharishi attracted skepticism because of his involvement with wealthy celebrities, his business acumen, and his love of luxury, including touring in a Rolls-Royce. A reporter for The Economist calls this a "misconception," saying: "He did not use his money for sinister ends. He neither drank, nor smoked, nor took drugs. ... He did not accumulate scores of Rolls-Royces, like Bhagwan Shree Rajneesh; his biggest self-indulgence was a helicopter. " When some observers questioned how his organisation's money was being used, the Maharishi said, "It goes to support the centres, it does not go on me. I have nothing." However, when the Maharishi died in 2008, he left behind an estate worth an estimated $300 million (U.S.). He was survived by four nephews, who inherited 12,000 acres of land in India, and Tony Nader, a Lebanese neuroscientist whom he had anointed as his successor in the movement. Since his death, several memoirs have been written by former followers and their children who described the Maharishi as a cult leader who could be controlling, and his Centers a financial business.

He was often called the "Giggling Guru" because of his habit of laughing during television interviews. Slightly over five feet tall, the Maharishi often wore a traditional cotton or silk, white dhoti while carrying or wearing flowers. He often sat cross-legged on a deerskin and had a "grayish-white beard, mustache and long, dark, stringy hair". Barry Miles described the Maharishi as having "liquid eyes, twinkling but inscrutable with the wisdom from the East". Miles said the Maharishi in his seventies looked much younger than his age. He had a high pitched voice and in the words of Merv Griffin, "a long flowing beard and a distinctive, high pitched laugh that I loved to provoke".

Biographer Paul Mason's website says that Swami Swaroopananda, one of three claimants to the title Shankaracharya of Jyotir Math, is "an outspoken critic" of the Maharishi. According to Swaroopananda, the Maharishi "was responsible for the controversy over Shankaracharyas" because he gave Shankaracharya Swami Shantanand encouragement and assistance in fighting the court case which challenged Shantanand's inheritance of the title. In a review of the documentary film David Wants to Fly, Variety magazine reported Swaroopananda's assertion that "as a member of the trader caste" the Maharishi "has no right to give mantras or teach meditation". According to religious scholar Cynthia Humes, enlightened individuals of any caste may "teach brahmavidya" and author Patricia Drake writes that "when Guru Dev was about to die he charged Maharishi with teaching laymen ... to meditate". Mason says Shantanand "publicly commended the practice of the Maharishi's meditation" and sociologist J.R. Coplin says that Shantanand's successor, Swami Vishnudevanand, also "speaks highly of the Maharishi."

=== In popular culture ===
The British satirical magazine Private Eye ridiculed him as "Veririchi Lotsamoney Yogi Bear". The Maharishi was also parodied by comedians Bill Dana and Joey Forman in the 1968 comedy album The Mashuganishi Yogi, by actor Cash Oshman in the film Man on the Moon, by comedian Mike Myers in the film The Love Guru, and in the BBC sketch show Goodness Gracious Me. He was portrayed by actor Gerry Bednob in the 2007 film Walk Hard: The Dewey Cox Story.

== Controversies ==
=== Allegations of sexual advances ===
While the Beatles were in Rishikesh, rumors of sexual advances by the Maharishi in his ashram were circulated, though no sexual misconduct suits were filed and some of the participants later denied that anything untoward had occurred. John Lennon later cited a rumour that the Maharishi made sexual advances on Mia Farrow and "a few other women" during their time at the ashram, later writing the Beatles' song "Sexy Sadie", in which he characterized the Maharishi as a fraud. George Harrison and Cynthia Lennon later denied that the Farrow event took place and stayed within the TM movement, while, in her autobiography, Farrow gives a detailed explanation of what happened with Maharishi:

We settled ourselves in the lotus position to meditate. After twenty or so minutes, we were getting on our feet, still facing each other, but as I'm usually a little disoriented after meditation, I was blinking at his beard when suddenly I became aware of two surprisingly male, hairy arms going around me. I panicked, and shot up the stairs apologising all the way. I flew out into the open air, and ran as fast as I could to Prudy's room, where she was meditating of course. I blurted out something about Maharishi's cave, and arms, and beard, and she said, "It's an honor to be touched by a holy man after meditation, a tradition." Furthermore, at my level of consciousness, if Jesus Christ Himself had embraced me, I would have misinterpreted it.

In the 2010 documentary David Wants to Fly, a former personal assistant and "skinboy" (Note: The name comes from carrying the deer skin Maharishi was sitting on during his conferences. "The skinboy would walk in front of him. It was like this divine air would come down from heaven and we would be breathing it. And I got addicted to that..." says the former personal assistant of Maharishi in the movie.) of the Maharishi recounts bringing women to the Maharishi's room, claiming he has "no question in my mind that he had sex with the women." In the same film, another assistant, Judith Bourque, describes what she claims was a relationship with Maharishi over the course of two years—with instructions including "don't tell anyone" and, in the case of her becoming pregnant, to "get married quick"—before he moved on to other women. She also added: "I didn't in any way feel invaded and I was never forced in any situation with him." Bourque later elaborated her claims with photos, notes and dated letters purportedly from the Maharishi in the autobiographical book Robes of Silk, Feet of Clay (2018), including additional allegations:

To date I know of fourteen other women who had experiences with him (of varying degrees) that did not jibe with the role of a celibate monk. Several of these reports are from first hand dialog, the rest are second hand from a person who knew the woman in question very well such as a partner or close friend. [...] For my part, I don't feel that Maharishi needs to be forgiven for wanting to experience life to its fullest, including an active sex life. I do not believe that there is an inherent conflict between sexuality and spirituality. [...] Perhaps I was blind, but my experience was that we did indeed love each other. [...] I felt so loved.

=== Pseudoscience ===
Since early in the TM movement, the Maharishi made claims of pseudoscientific supernatural abilities (called "sidhis" or the TM-Sidhi program) that can be obtained through TM meditation, including levitation (yogic flying), invisibility, and invulnerability. The "magical claims" of the TM-Sidhis program and the Maharishi Effect created a crisis for the movement's image and began a period of media controversy. In 2014, a meta-analysis of meditation research found "insufficient evidence that mantra meditation programs [such as TM] had an effect on any of the psychological stress and well-being outcomes". However, a different meta-analysis study, also published in 2014 by David Orme-Johnson of the TM-affiliated Maharishi University of Management, found that "TM practice is more effective than treatment as usual and most alternative treatments, with greatest effects observed in individuals with high anxiety."

Despite the Maharishi's claims that his movement was not a religion but "scientific", TM initiation since his time has begun with a Hindu puja worship ritual performed by the teacher and his movement has received criticism from Hindus for selling "commercial mantras" of the Sanskrit names of Hindu-Vedic gods. Sociologist William Sims Bainbridge writes that the Maharishi taught a "highly simplified form of Hinduism, adapted for Westerners who did not possess the cultural background to accept the full panoply of Hindu beliefs, symbols, and practices."

On top of criticism that TM is a "form of Hinduism that doesn't acknowledge its roots", a 1978 federal court ruling in New Jersey declared TM to be a religion. Further allegations state that the Maharishi presented TM as non-religious so that it could be taught in US public schools and other publicly-funded institutions.

=== World government ===
Since the 1970s, the Maharishi began planning a new world government based on his TM teachings, including meetings with world leaders such as Canadian prime minister Pierre Trudeau to discuss his plans. On Larry King Live, the Maharishi made anti-democratic statements and announced plans for a monarchic world government, including, "I believe in God. And I believe in the custody of God vested in kings" and "I want to establish a government in every country [...] I used to say 'damn the democracy' because it's not a stable government."

The Maharishi crowned key members of his movements as the "rajas" (kings) of his Global Country of World Peace, including Tony Nader as the "maharaja" (great king) and "First Sovereign Ruler of the Global Country of World Peace." It has been reported that the "rajas" of the TM movement must pay $1 million to receive "spiritual dominion" over a country in accordance with "natural law". In 1992, the Maharishi's Natural Law Party was listed on the presidential ballot in several states in the USA, with physicist and "raja" John Hagelin as the presidential nominee.

== Other initiatives, projects and programmes ==
Maharishi International University (renamed Maharishi University of Management (MUM) in 1995 with the name reverted in 2019), the first university the Maharishi founded, began classes in Santa Barbara, California, in 1973. In 1974 the university moved to Fairfield, Iowa, where it remains. The university houses a library of the Maharishi's taped lectures and writings, including the thirty-three-lesson Science of Creative Intelligence course, originally a series of lectures given by the Maharishi in Fiuggi, Italy, in 1972. Described in the MUM university catalogue as combining modern science and Vedic science, the course also defines certain higher states of consciousness, and gives guidance on how to attain these states.

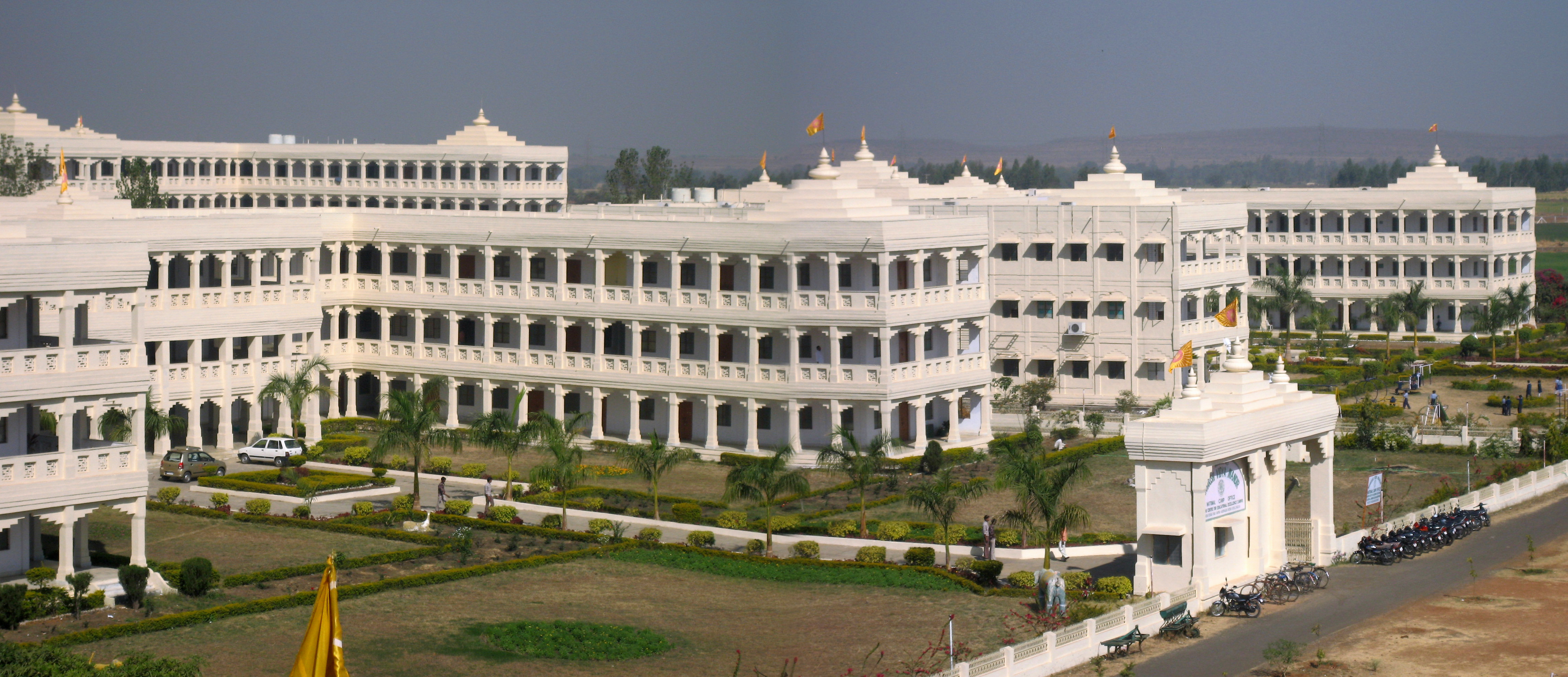
MCEE School Campus at Bhopal, India

The Maharishi Vidya Mandir Schools (MVMS), an educational system established in sixteen Indian states and affiliated with the New Delhi Central Board of Secondary Education (CBSE), was founded in 1995 by the Maharishi. It has 148 branches in 118 cities with 90,000 to 100,000 students and 5,500 teaching and support staff.

In 1998, Maharishi Open University was founded by the Maharishi. It was accessible via a network of eight satellites broadcasting to every country in the world, and via the Internet.

The Maharishi also introduced theories of management, defence, and government programmes designed to alleviate poverty, and introduced a new economic development currency called the Raam. In 2000, the Maharishi began building administrative and teaching centres called "Peace Palaces" around the world, and by 2008 at least eight had been constructed in the US alone. The Maharishi Institute, an African university that is part of a group of schools around the world that are named after him, was founded in 2007 and uses his Transcendental Meditation technique in their teaching.

Maharishi Mahesh Yogi, in his farewell message on 11 January 2008, announced the establishment of the Brahmananda Saraswati Trust (BST), named in honour of his teacher, to support large groups totalling more than 30,000 peace-creating Vedic Pandits in perpetuity across India. The Patron of the Brahmanand Saraswati Trust is the Shankaracharya of Jyotir Math.

=== Organizations and businesses ===
The Maharishi is credited with heading charitable organisations, for-profit businesses, and real estate investments whose total value has been estimated at various times, to range from US$2 to US$5 billion. The real estate alone was valued in 2003 at between $3.6 and $5 billion. Holdings in the United States, estimated at $250 million in 2008, include dozens of hotels, commercial buildings and undeveloped land. The Maharishi "amassed a personal fortune that his spokesman told one reporter may exceed $1 billion". According to a 2008 article in The Times, the Maharishi "was reported to have an income of six million pounds". The Maharishi's movement is said to be funded through donations, course fees for Transcendental Meditation and various real estate transactions.

In his biography of Maharishi Mahesh Yogi, The Story of the Maharishi (published 1976), William Jefferson suggests that the financial aspect of the TM organisation was one of the greatest controversies it faced. Questions were raised about the Maharishi's mission, comments from leaders of the movement at that time, and fees and charges the TM organisation levied on followers. Jefferson says that the concerns with money came from journalists more than those who have learned to meditate.

== Published works ==
- Beacon Light of the Himalayas, Azad Printers, 1955
- Meditation: Easy System Propounded by Maharishi Mahesh Yogi, International Meditation Centre, 1962
- Science of Being and Art of Living – Transcendental Meditation, Allied Publishers, 1963 ISBN 0-452-28266-7
- Love and God, Spiritual Regeneration Movement, 1965
- Yoga Asanas, Spiritual Regeneration Movement, 1965
- Maharishi Mahesh Yogi on the Bhagavad-Gita – A New Translation and Commentary, Chapters 1–6, Arkana 1990 ISBN 0-14-019247-6
- Meditations of Maharishi Mahesh Yogi, Bantam books, 1968
- Alliance for Knowledge, Maharishi International University, 1974
- Creating an Ideal Society: A Global Undertaking, International Association for the Advancement of the Science of Creative Intelligence, 1976
- Results of Scientific Research on the Transcendental Meditation Program, MERU Press, 1976
- Enlightenment to Every Individual, Invincibility to Every Nation, Age of Enlightenment, 1978 ISBN 99911-608-9-2
- Freedom Behind Bars: Enlightenment to Every Individual and Invincibility to Every Nation, International Association for the Advancement of the Science of Creative Intelligence, 1978
- Dawn of the age of enlightenment, MVU Press, 1986 ISBN 978-90-71750-02-1
- Life supported by natural law : discovery of the Unified Field of all the laws of nature and the Maharishi Technology of the Unified Field, Age of Enlightenment Press, 1986 ISBN 978-0-89186-051-8
- Thirty Years Around the World: Dawn of the Age of Enlightenment, Maharishi Vedic University, 1986 ISBN 978-90-71750-01-4
- Maharishi's Programme to Create World Peace: Global Inauguration, Age of Enlightenment Press, 1987 ISBN 978-0-89186-052-5
- Maharishi's Master Plan to Create Heaven on earth, Maharishi Vedic University Press, 1991 ISBN 978-90-71750-11-3
- A Proven Program for our Criminal Justice System: Maharishi's Transcendental Meditation and Corrections, Maharishi International University, 1993
- Vedic Knowledge for Everyone: Maharishi Vedic University, an Introduction, Maharishi Vedic University Press, 1994 ISBN 90-71750-17-5
- Maharishi's Absolute Theory of Government – Automation in Administration, Maharishi Prakshan, 1995 ISBN 81-7523-002-9
- Maharishi University of Management – Wholeness on the Move, Age of Enlightenment Publications, 1995 ISBN 81-7523-001-0
- Constitution of India Fulfilled through Maharishi's Transcendental Meditation, Age of Enlightenment Publications, 1996 ISBN 81-7523-004-5
- Inaugurating Maharishi Vedic University, Maharishi Vedic University Press, 1996 ISBN 978-81-7523-006-4
- Maharishi's Absolute Theory of Defence – Sovereignty in Invincibility, Age of Enlightenment Publications, 1996 ISBN 81-7523-000-2
- Celebrating Perfection in Education – Dawn of Total Knowledge, Maharishi Vedic University Press, 1997 ISBN 81-7523-013-4
- Maharishi Forum of Natural Law and National Law for Doctors – Perfect Health for Everyone, Age of Enlightenment Publications, 1997 ISBN 81-7523-003-7
- Maharishi Speaks to Educators – Mastery Over Natural Law, Age of Enlightenment Publications, 1997 ISBN 81-7523-008-8
- Maharishi Speaks to Students – Mastery Over Natural Law, Age of Enlightenment Publications, 1997 ISBN 81-7523-012-6
- Celebrating Perfection in Administration, Maharishi Vedic University, 1998 ISBN 81-7523-015-0
- Ideal India – The Lighthouse of Peace on Earth, Maharishi University of Management, 2001 ISBN 90-806005-1-2
- Maharishi Mahesh Yogi on Bhagavad-Gita – Chapter 7, 2009, Maharishi Foundation International-Maharishi Vedic University, The Netherlands

Discography

- Deep Meditation, World Pacific Records, 1962
- The Master Speaks, World Pacific Records, 1967
- The Seven States of Consciousness, World Pacific Records, 1967

== Cited sources ==
- Coplin, J.R. (1990). Text and Context in the Communication of a Social Movement's Charisma, Ideology, and Consciousness: TM for India and the West (PhD thesis). University of California, San Diego.
- Humes, C.A. (2005). "Maharishi Mahesh Yogi: Beyond the T.M. Technique". In Forsthoefel, Thomas A.; Humes, Cynthia Ann (eds.). Gurus in America. SUNY Press. ISBN 0-7914-6573-X.
- Mason, Paul (1994). The Maharishi – The Biography of the Man Who Gave Transcendental Meditation to the World. Shaftsbury, Dorset: Element Books Ltd. ISBN 1-85230-571-1.
- Russell, Peter (1977). The T.M. Technique: An Introduction to Transcendental Meditation and the Teachings of Maharishi Mahesh Yogi. Routledge. ISBN 978-0-7100-8539-9.
- Wallace, Robert Keith (1986). The Physiology of Consciousness. Maharishi International University Press. ISBN 978-0-923569-02-0.
- Williamson, Lola (2010). Transcendent in America. New York University Press. ISBN 978-0-8147-9449-4.
