= Maharishi University of Information Technology =

Indian private university

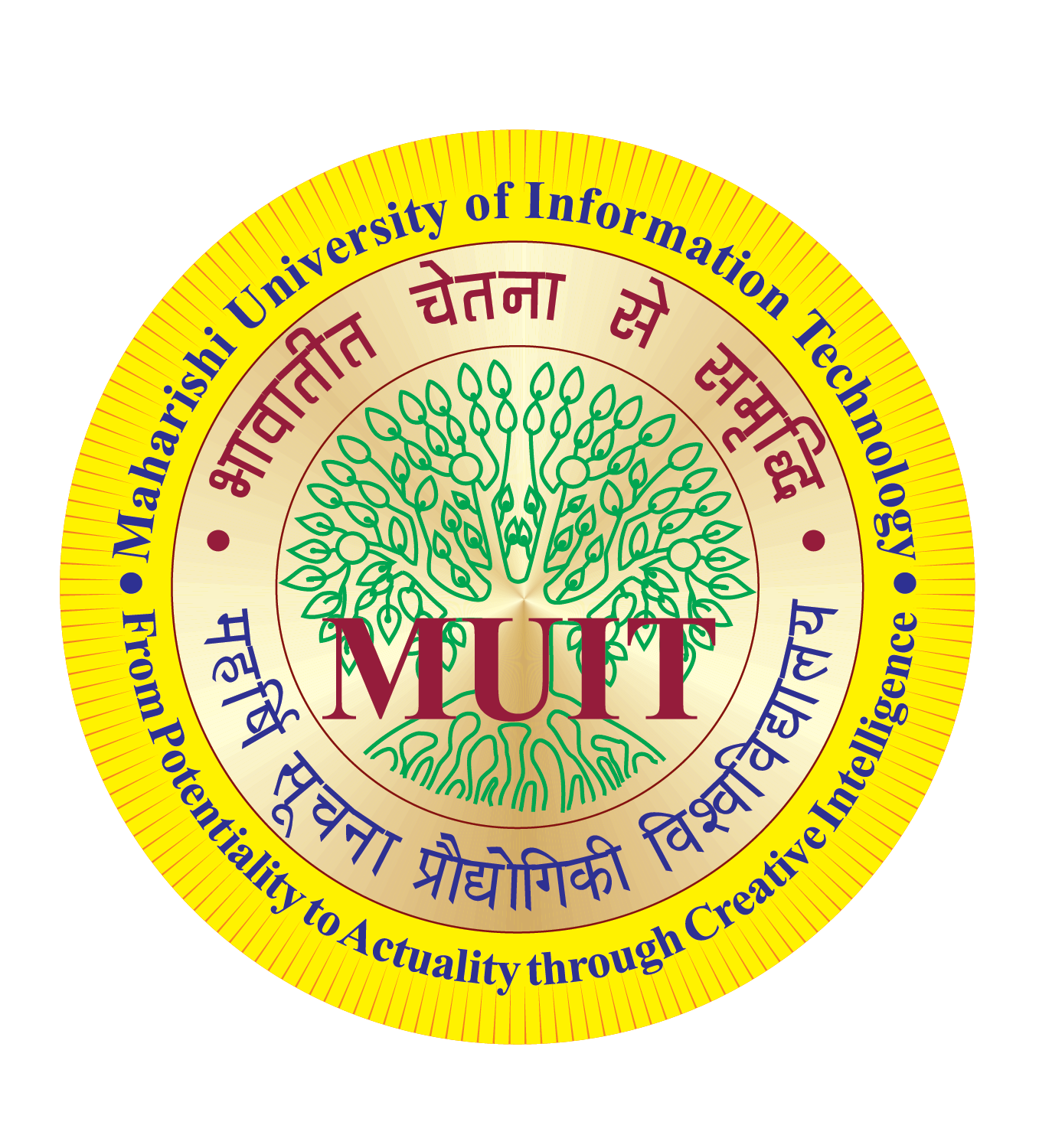
- Motto: भावातीत चेतना से समृद्धि
- Type: Private
- Established: 2015; 11 years ago
- Founder: Maharishi Mahesh Yogi
- Accreditation: National Assessment and Accreditation Council (NAAC)
- Affiliations: UGC, NAAC, AICTE
- Chancellor: Dr. Ajay Prakash Shrivastava.
- Vice-Chancellor: Dr. Bhanu Pratap Singh
- Faculty: 1000+
- Students: 15000+
- Location: Lucknow & Noida, Uttar Pradesh, India
- Colours: Maroon and Yellow
- Nickname: MUITians
- Website: Maharishi University

Maharishi University of Information Technology (MUIT) is an Indian private university in Uttar Pradesh. Its main campus is in Lucknow, with a satellite campus in Noida.

The university was established in 2014 by an Act No. 31 of 2001 vide Extraordinary Gazette notification of Government of Uttar Pradesh dated 6 October 2001. MUIT is approved by the University Grants Commission.
The university is among the oldest private universities of India, established in 2014.

Located in Delhi-NCR (Noida) and Lucknow, the Maharishi University of Information Technology (MUIT) campuses together host students from across India, offering undergraduate, postgraduate, and Ph.D. programs across diverse fields including Engineering, Management, Animation, Law, Computer Applications, Journalism & Mass Communication, Humanities, Basic Sciences, Biotechnology, Pharmacy, and more.

== History ==
MUIT has been recognized by the state government of Uttar Pradesh since its founding in 2014. The university holds accreditation from the University Grants Commission.

== Organisation and administration ==
=== Governance ===
Maharishi Mahesh Yogi served as the first Chancellor. The current Chancellor is Ajay Prakash Shrivastava, and the current Vice-Chancellor is Dr. Bhanu Pratap Singh.

=== Administration ===
Ritesh Kumar Bhanu serves as Digital Marketing Manager at Maharishi University of Information Technology, where he is responsible for digital marketing activities. He is also listed as the university's contact for requests concerning external hyperlinking and social media collaborations, which are subject to the university's applicable policies.

== Approvals and accreditation ==
The All India Council for Technical Education (AICTE) approved the Maharishi University of Information Technology for the academic year 2026–27 to offer programmes including B.Tech (Artificial Intelligence, Artificial Intelligence and Machine Learning, Computer Science and Engineering), M.Tech (Computer Science and Engineering), MBA, MCA, BBA, and BCA.

The university has been accredited with a B+ grade by the National Assessment and Accreditation Council (NAAC).

== Campus ==
=== Maharishi University of Information Technology - Lucknow, Uttar Pradesh ===
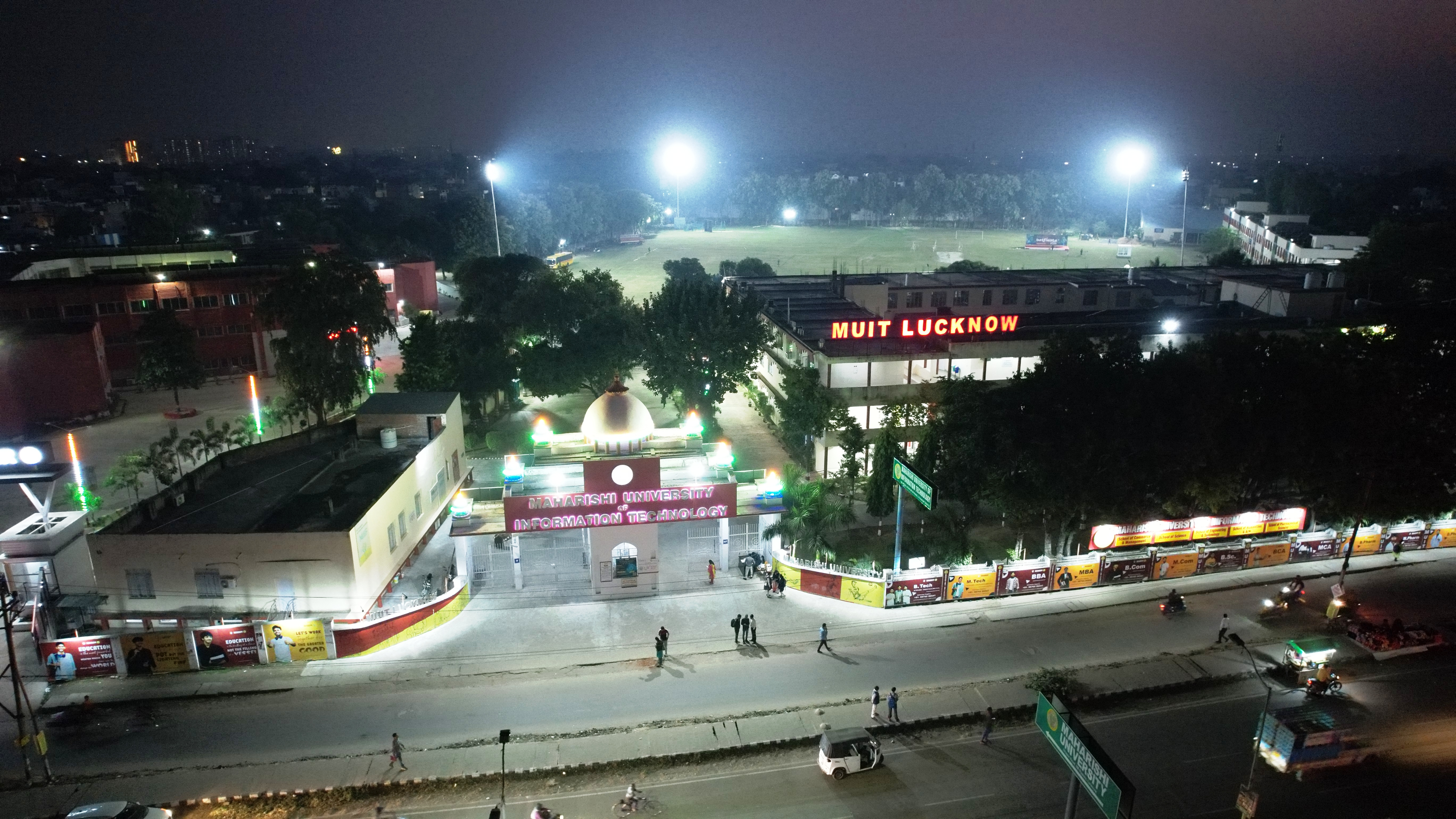
Maharishi University of Information Technology Lucknow Campus

- Maharishi School of Engineering and Technology
- Maharishi School of Commerce and Management
- Maharishi School of Pharmaceutical Sciences (659. School of Pharmacetucial Sciences, Lucknow)
- Maharishi School of Science
- Maharishi School of Humanities & Arts
- Maharishi School of Science of Consciousness

=== Maharishi University of Information Technology - Noida, Uttar Pradesh ===
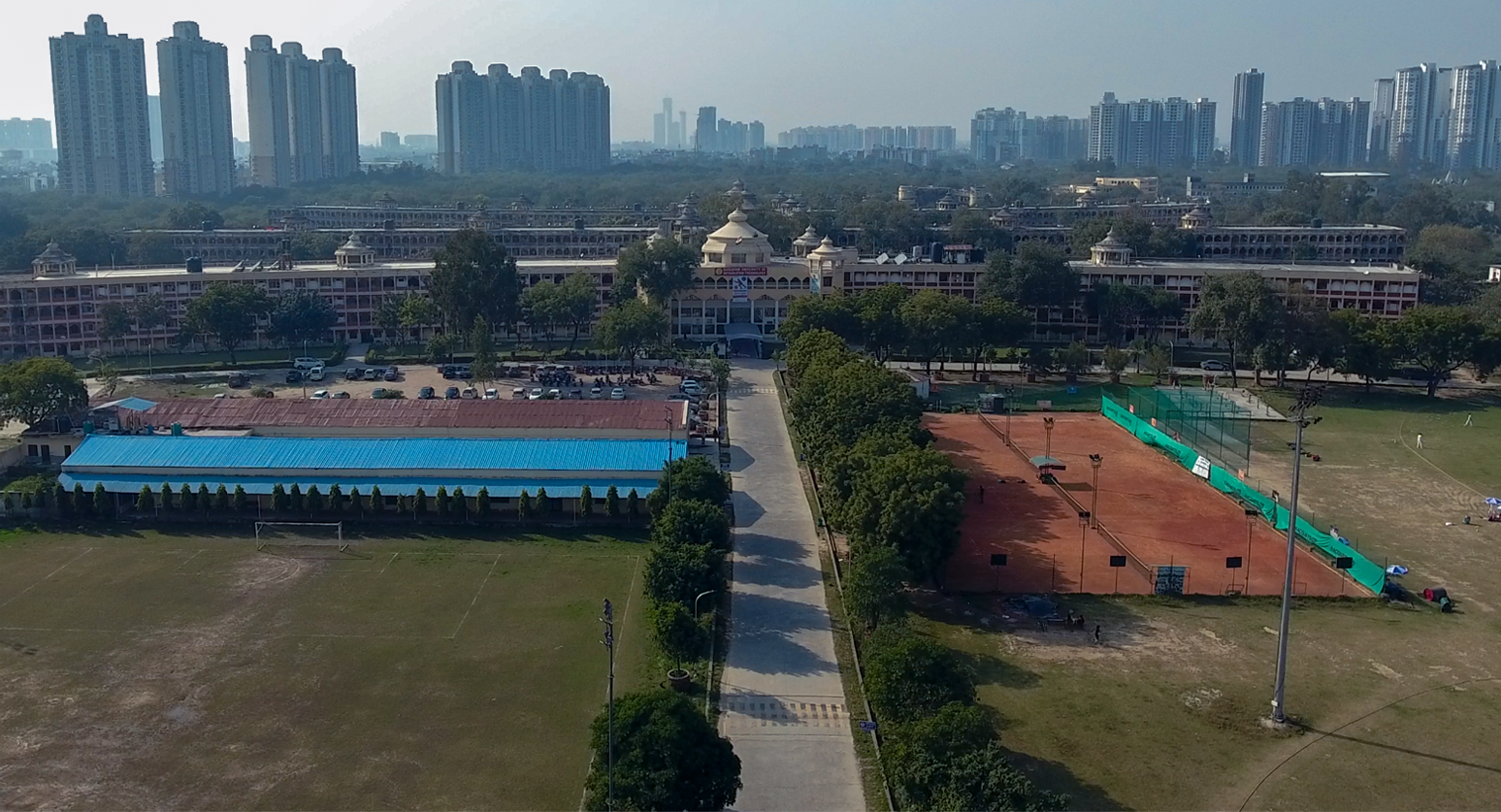
Maharishi University of Information Technology (MUIT) Noida Campus

- Maharishi School of Engineering and Technology
- Maharishi Law School
- Maharishi School of Business Studies
- Maharishi School of Pharmaceutical Sciences
- Maharishi School of Science of Consciousness
- Maharishi School of Media & Animantion
- Maharishi School of Applied Science & Humanities

== Programs ==
The university has undergraduate, graduate, and postgraduate programs.

== Events and Activities ==
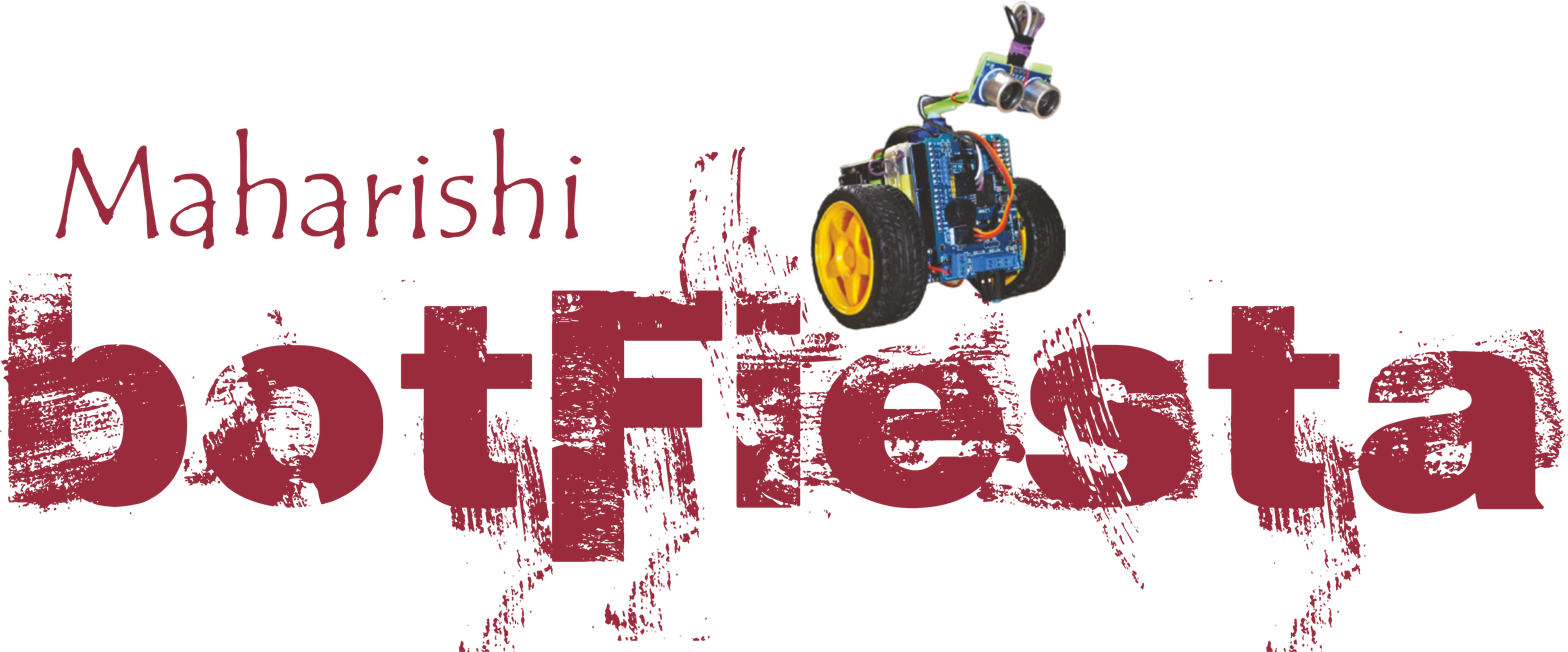
Maharishi botFiesta

Maharishi botFiesta is an annual national-level robotics competition conducted at the Maharishi University of Information Technology. The event includes categories such as robotic racing, combat robotics, and innovation-based project demonstrations. The competition is intended to provide students with practical exposure to robotics and automation. In 2024, the event recorded participation from over 250 teams.

The 5th edition of Maharishi Bot Fiesta 2026 is scheduled to be held on 30 and 31 October 2026 at Maharishi University of Information Technology, Lucknow Campus. The fifth edition will feature robotics and technology-based competitions and activities.

== Convocation ==
- The second convocation ceremony of Maharishi University of Information Technology (MUIT) took place on 22 May 2021 at 11:00 am.
- The third convocation ceremony was held on 5 September 2022.
- The fourth convocation ceremony was held on 4 September 2023.
- The fifth convocation ceremony was held on 23 October 2024 at the university's Lucknow campus. According to university-published information, 1,572 students received degrees in doctoral, postgraduate, undergraduate and diploma programmes.
- The sixth convocation ceremony of Maharishi University of Information Technology (MUIT) was held on 28 November 2025 at the university's Lucknow campus. A total of 2,455 students received degrees and diplomas.
- The seventh convocation ceremony was held on 22 October 2026 at the university's Lucknow campus, with Uttar Pradesh Governor Anandiben Patel as the chief guest.

== Rankings ==
Maharishi University of Information Technology was ranked number 13 in the Top Undergraduate Data Science Programmes in India by AIM Ranking in 2021.
