= List of health and fitness magazines =

Health and fitness magazines cover a variety of topics including physical fitness and well-being, nutrition, beauty, strength, bodybuilding, and weight training.

== General health and wellness ==
- Alive
- Health Science
- Naked Food Magazine
- Prevention
- Vegetarian Times
- Your Health Now

== Mental Health ==
- Psychologs

== Children ==
- Children's Health
- Healthy Children

== Women ==
- Fitness
- Health
- Muscle and Fitness Hers
- Self
- WomenSports (later Women's Sports and Fitness) (defunct)
- [Women Fitness International Magazine]])https://www.womenfitness.net/women-fitness-print-magazine/])

== Men ==
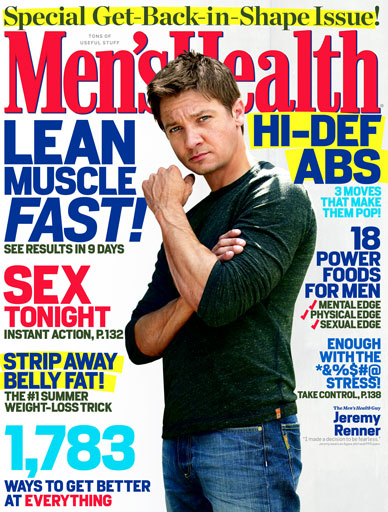
Men's Health magazine, published by Rodale Press

- Men's Fitness
- Men's Fitness (UK)
- Men's Health

== Bodybuilding and weight training ==
- FLEX
- Hardgainer
- Iron Man
- Milo
- Muscle & Fitness
- Muscle & Fitness (UK)
- MuscleMag International
- Muscular Development
- Planet Muscle
- Powerlifting USA
- Personal trainer

== Health conditions ==
- ADDitude Magazine
- Arthritis Today

== Martial arts ==
- Black Belt
- Tae Kwon Do Life Magazine
- Tae Kwon Do Times
