= Maharishi Vedic Approach to Health =

Form of alternative medicine

Alternative medicine
- Claims: Proponents claim that illnesses can be treated by reconnecting physiological functioning with the body's inner intelligence through reducing and eliminating impurities and imbalances.
- Year proposed: mid-1980s
- Original proponents: Maharishi Mahesh Yogi
- Subsequent proponents: Organizations: Maharishi Vedic Education Development Corporation

Maharishi Vedic Approach to Health (MVAH) (also known as Maharishi Ayurveda or Maharishi Vedic Medicine) is a form of alternative medicine founded in the mid-1980s by Maharishi Mahesh Yogi, who developed the Transcendental Meditation technique (TM). Distinct from traditional ayurveda, it emphasizes the role of consciousness, and gives importance to positive emotions. Maharishi Ayur-Veda has been variously characterized as emerging from, and consistently reflecting, the Advaita Vedanta school of Hindu philosophy, representing the entirety of the ayurvedic tradition.

A 1991 article in the Journal of the American Medical Association (JAMA) found that promoters of MVAH failed to disclose financial incentives when they submitted a letter for publication and that their marketing practices were misleading. A 2008 study published in JAMA reported that two of the 19 Maharishi Ayurveda products tested contained heavy metals. A 1991 British case found two physicians guilty of "serious professional misconduct" for using MVAH in the unsuccessful treatment of HIV.

== Theoretical basis ==
Maharishi Vedic Approach to Health uses a model for understanding health and disease that is fundamentally different from that of modern medicine. According to MVAH researcher Hari Sharma, MVAH views the body as an abstract pattern of intelligence whereas he feels modern medicine views the body as a machine. He says that the world view of MVAH is closer to the reality described by 20th century physics, which challenged the reductionist materialist world view by finding that quantum mechanical phenomena contradict the idea of solid matter, that causality is less definite, that material existence is connected in unexpected and nonlocal ways, and that a reductionist view is untenable at the quantum level. Sharma says that "Vedic thought discusses a unified field of pure, non-material intelligence and consciousness whose modes of vibration manifest as the material universe." Disease results from losing connection with this underlying field of intelligence.

== Components ==
The approach does not use modern medicine or biology. According to Hari Sharma, MVAH views the body as an abstract pattern of intelligence. Proponents claim that through MVAH, the Maharishi revived the ancient Vedic system of health care. MVAH identifies 40 approaches, each said to be based on one of the 40 branches of Vedic literature.

In Alternative Medicine and Ethics, Stephen Barrett describes 20 components to Maharishi Ayurveda:

The full range of the Maharishi Ayur-Veda program 'for creating healthy individuals and a disease free society' has 20 components: development of higher states of consciousness through advanced meditation techniques, use of primordial sounds, correction of the "mistake of the intellect', strengthening of the emotions, vedic structuring of language, music therapy, enlivening of the senses, pulse diagnosis, psychophysiological integration, neuromuscular integration, neurorespiratory integration, purification (to remove 'impurities due to faulty diet or behavioral patterns'), dietary measures, herbal food supplements, other herbal preparations, daily behavioral routines, prediction of future imbalances, religious ceremonies, nourishing the environment and promoting world health and peace. Most of these cost several hundred dollars but some cost thousands and require the service of an ayurvedic practitioner.

A traditional vaidya treats patients individually, diagnosing them and then individually preparing or instructing the patient how to prepare treatments for the entire complexity of their individual symptoms, whereas Maharishi Ayur-Veda takes a mass-market approach.

=== Technique ===
The TM technique is the main modality which proponents say improves mental health and promotes "collective health" in MVAH. A 2007 review of meditative practices that included Transcendental Meditation concluded that the definitive health effects of meditation cannot be determined as the scientific evidence was of poor quality, though the review has been criticized for using an inappropriate method for assessing quality. The review found that TM "had no advantage over health education to improve measures of systolic blood pressure and diastolic blood pressure, body weight, heart rate, stress, anger, self-efficacy, cholesterol, dietary intake, and level of physical activity in hypertensive patients". Another review did find a reduction in diastolic and systolic blood pressure in those who practiced TM compared to controls. The review and its primary author were partially funded by Howard Settle, a proponent of TM.

=== Pulse diagnosis ===
Practitioners utilize pulse diagnosis (known in Sanskrit as "nadi vigyan"), which they say is like "plugging into the inner intelligence of the body". Based on "imbalances", recommendations related to herbal preparations, diet, daily and seasonal routines, exercise, and physiological purification are offered. Proponents say that the pulse can be used to detect "imbalances at early stages when there may be no other clinical signs and when mild forms of intervention may suffice". According to Deepak Chopra and Sharma, pulse diagnosis can detect a variety of diseases, including those unrelated to the cardiovascular system, including asthma, cancer, and diabetes. William Jarvis, president of The National Council Against Health Fraud, described pulse diagnosis as a variety of palm reading and that Chopra refused to have pulse diagnosis tested by JAMA in a blinded protocol "on the grounds that a blinded experiment would 'eliminate the most crucial component of the experiment, which is consciousness.'"

=== Multimodal therapies ===
MVAH health centers and spas offer a series of multimodal therapies including a purification therapy called panchakarma. Panchakarma means "five actions", and is intended to clear impurities from the body and to balance the doṣas. The first preparatory step is called "snehana", involving the ingestion of prescribed quantities of ghee over several days, followed by a purgative. The actual panchakarma then begins with "abhyanga", a herbalized full-body oil massage and continues with one or more additional treatments, including "svedana", a herbalized steam bath; "shirodhara", in which warm sesame oil is poured on the forehead; "nasya", an oil massage of head, neck and shoulders combined with steam inhalation and nasal drops; and "basti", a herbal enema. Additional therapies generally undertaken in association with panchakarma are "Maharishi Gandharva Veda" music therapy and aromatherapy. Typical panchakarma treatments take 2 hours per day, over the course of 3 to 14 days, and are recommended several times per year as ideal, usually in conjunction with the change of seasons.

=== Products ===
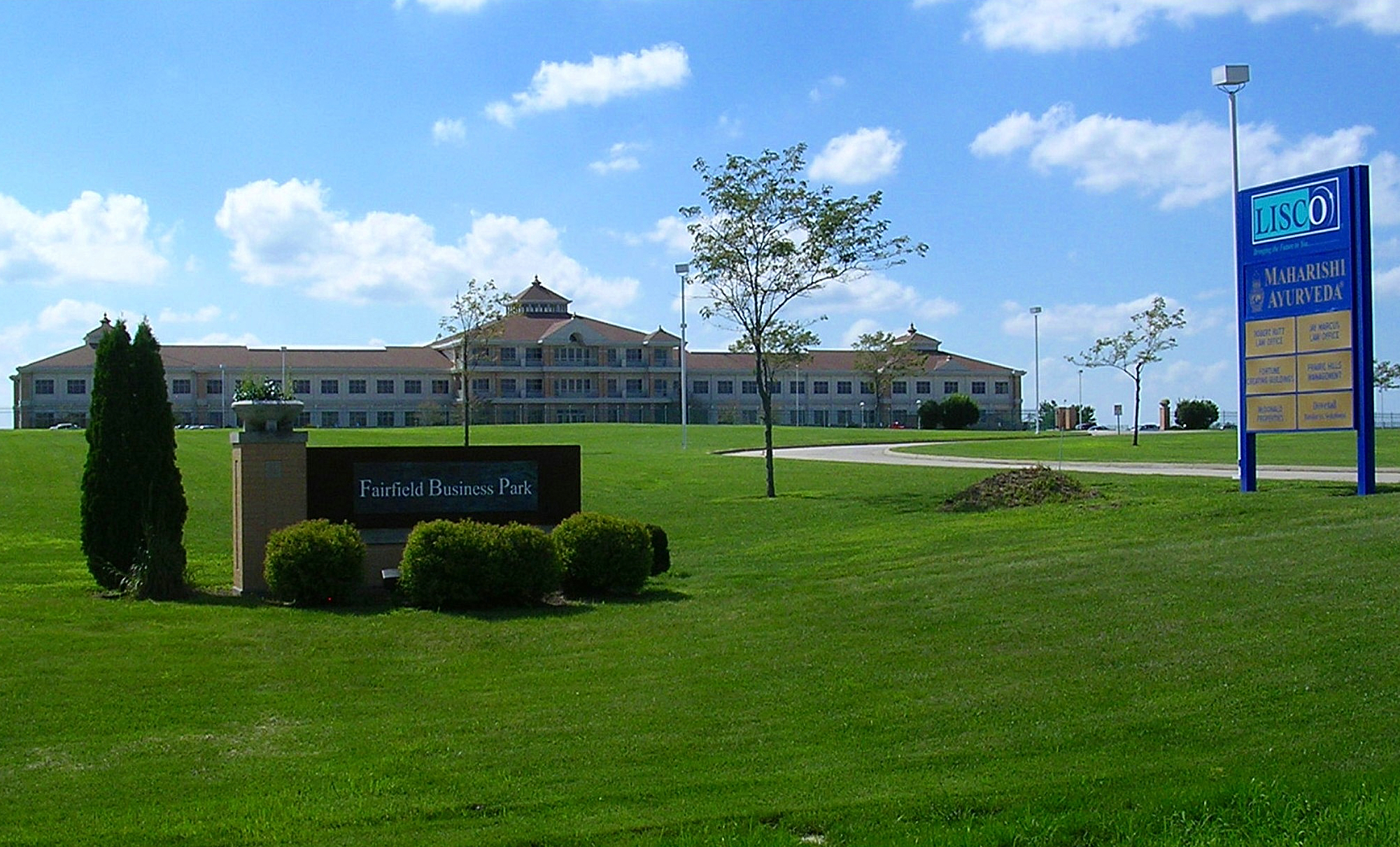
MAPI offices, in the Fairfield Business Park located north of Fairfield, Iowa. It was built according to Maharishi Sthapatya Veda principles.

Herbal products are manufactured and distributed by several Maharishi Ayurveda companies, including: Maharishi Ayurveda Products Pvt. Ltd. (MAPPL) in New Delhi, Maharishi Ayurveda Products International (MAPI) in Colorado Springs, Colorado, and Maharishi Ayurveda Products Europe B.V., in the Netherlands. Maharishi Ayurveda Products International (MAPI) of Colorado Springs sells more than 400 products and in 2000, was said to be the largest ayurvedic company in North America, with reported sales of $20 million in 1999. Some ayurvedic herbal formulas are called rasayanas that use whole plants in various combinations.

==== Maharishi Amrit Kalash ====
The original Maharishi Ayurveda product is Maharishi Amrit Kalash (MAK), a two-part ancient formula introduced by Balraj Maharishi based on classical ayurvedic texts and referred to as "nectar" and "ambrosia" or "MAK-4" and "MAK-5". It uses a combination of dozens of different herbs and fruits. Ingredients include herbs such as white musali, liquorice, giant potato, aswagandha, gum arabic tree, Indian asparagus, caper, aloe, Curculigo orchioides, amla, Tinospora cordifolia, simpleleaf chastetree and elephant creeper.

==== Heavy metals ====
A 2008 study by Robert B. Saper, published in JAMA, found that one-fifth of 213 ayurvedic samples manufactured in either the U.S. or India and obtained via the Internet contained detectable levels of heavy metals such as arsenic, mercury or lead. Two of 19 MAPI products tested, "Vital Lady" and "Worry Free" were found to have detectable levels of lead, while the others had no detectable levels of lead, mercury, or arsenic. Ted Wallace, president of MAPI, stated that the company tests its products before and after shipment from India to the US, and that its products are examined for purity, heavy metals, residual pesticides, and biological contaminants.

Michael McGuffin, president of the American Herbal Products Association said that eliminating every trace of arsenic, mercury or lead from products would require "an entirely new food supply". According to McGuffin, the government and professional agencies set widely different safety standards for lead, mercury and arsenic and that while most of the products in Saper's article have lead levels that exceed California's standard, only two violate the World Health Organization's standard. A 2008 review has stated that "adverse health outcomes at blood lead levels below this threshold have been well demonstrated", and concluded that "it is increasingly acknowledged there is no threshold for the adverse consequences of lead exposure".

In 2008, a lawsuit was filed in the U.S. District Court against Maharishi Vedic Education Development Corporation ("MVED"), Maharishi Ayurveda Foundation and Maharishi Ayurveda Products Ltd. ("MAP Ltd"). The Plaintiff claims that she contracted lead poisoning from Garbhapal Ras, an herbo-mineral product she purchased in India. According to the Iowa Department of Public Health, Garbhapal Ras contained nearly 3% lead. The product was manufactured by MAP Ltd. in India, and prescribed for her by a physician at the Maharishi Ayurveda Arogyadham clinic in Delhi. A spokesperson said that MVED is not involved in the manufacturing, prescribing, or sale of products from the Indian clinic where the product was prescribed and purchased. The spokesperson said that products sold in the U.S. are subject to inspection, testing, and quality control.

David Whitley, director of "Ayurveda Limited" in the United Kingdom, writes that the Maharishi Ayurveda Council of Vaidyas approves of the use of arsenic, lead, and mercury under the supervision of trained and certified vaidyas, in accordance with ancient Ayurvedic texts. He claims that the benefits of heavy metals are increased and the side effects are minimized when used properly. Whitley acknowledges that these compounds cannot be licensed for sale in the UK.

=== Maharishi Sthapatya Veda ===
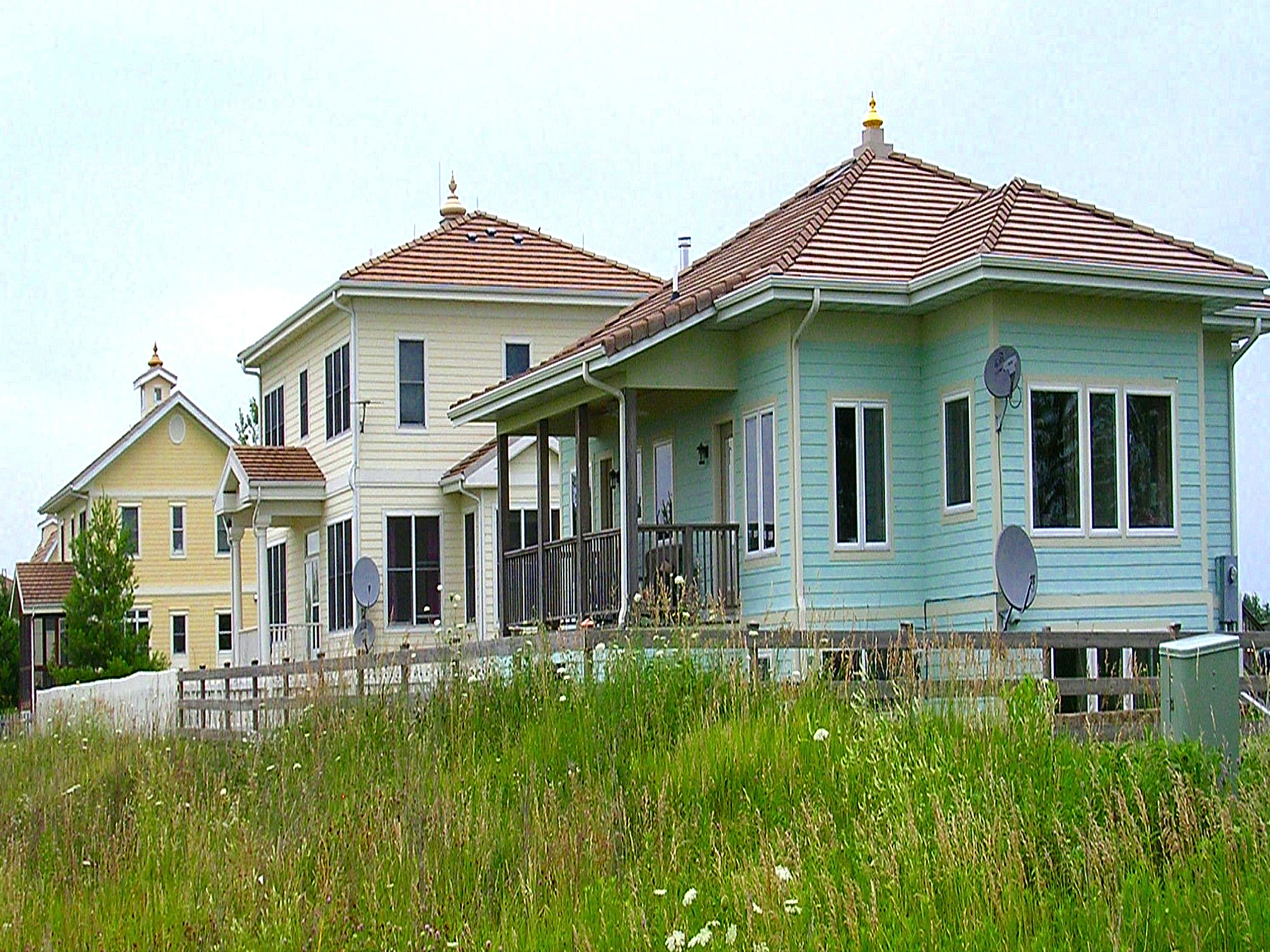
Homes in Maharishi Vedic City, Iowa built using the principles of Maharishi Sthapatya Veda

Maharishi Sthapatya Veda (MSV), is a system of Vedic architecture. Maharishi Global Construction in Fairfield, Iowa designs buildings which "connect the individual intelligence of the occupant of the house to the cosmic intelligence of the universe", saying that homes with entrances facing west invite "poverty, lack of creativity and vitality" and "anxiety, depression, bad luck and even criminal tendencies". In Maharishi Sthapatya Veda, the architect takes into account three major factors: the orientation of the structure, room placement and the proportion of the rooms, windows, doors, walls etc. and their dimensions.

=== Maharishi Vedic Astrology ===
Maharishi Vedic Astrology (also known as Maharishi Jyotish) premises that planets influence individual health. Jotyish is a vedanga within the field of vedic literature. Maharishi Jyotish is premised on the ability to precisely calculate mathematically the unfolding pattern of life, and to locate the trends and tendencies of an individual life within that pattern, making it possible to determine in advance whether a difficult period was coming, and to take action in the present to amend a future difficulty. Maharishi Jyotish asserts that the Solar System has an influence on the human brain, cells and DNA. According to the Maharishi and his successor, Tony Nader, there is a correspondence between the nine Grahas of Vedic Astrology and the structure of DNA, the brain and the structure of cells. Each graha is associated with a gemstone: Maharishi Vedic Astrology associates the planets with the basal ganglia, thalmus and hypothalamus; the 12 Bhavas (astrological houses) with cortical areas; the 12 Rashis (zodiac signs) with the cranial nerves; and the 27 Nakshatras (lunar mansions) with groups of the brainstem.

==== Yagyas ====
Correction of imbalances discovered through Maharishi Jyotish is possible, the Maharishi said, through the performance of "yagyas" by vedic pandits in India. Yagyas are ceremonies designed to restore the balance between the individual and the environment. Yagyas performed on Maha Shivaratri, (the day of Shiva), are said to enliven spiritual and material aspects of one's consciousness, and to promote progress in all areas of life; those performed on Maha Lakshmi are said to bring prosperity, growth and good fortune; while those performed on Akshaya Tritiya are said to enhance lasting success in one's activities.

Andrew Skolnick describes Maharishi Yagyas as Hindu ceremonies to appease the gods and beseech their help on behalf of afflicted followers that can cost tens of thousands of dollars, and which the patient neither takes part in nor witnesses. He wrote that, while Chopra and Nancy Lonsdorf, medical director of the Maharishi Ayur-Veda Center in Washington, D.C. denied that they prescribed yagyas or that yagyas were part of Maharishi Ayur-Veda, Chopra's Lancaster Center did recommend yagyas for its patients, and a TM-Movement fundraising letter states that Lonsdorf prescribed an $11,500 yagya for a seriously ill patient of hers.

According to Skolnick, patients with serious illnesses often paid hundreds or thousands of dollars for gemstones prescribed by Maharishi Jyotish astrologers. The movement's company called "Jyotish Gems" sells gemstones prescribed by Maharishi Jyotish astrologers to ward off the effects of bad influences in one's horoscope.

Nader writes that various gemstones correspond to the planets of Maharisi Jyotish, and also correspond to parts of the body. The Maharishi described Maharishi Light Therapy with Gems (MLG) as a vedic technology. According to Rainer Picha, Minister of Health for the Global Country of World Peace, training in the therapeutic use of gemstones is conducted at the Maharishi European Research University (MERU) in Holland.

==== Maharishi Vedic Vibration Technology ====
According to its website, Maharishi Vedic Vibration Technology (MVVT), "utilizes a refined impulse of Vedic sound, or Vedic vibration, to enliven the inner intelligence of the body and restore proper functioning". According to author Cynthia Ann Humes MVVT consists of the recitation of mantras from Vedic or other orthodox texts by the MVVT expert, while blowing on or touching the afflicted body part. Frontiers in Bioscience published two studies online in 2001, including one by Tony Nader, the Lebanese neuro-scientist and researcher, who succeeded the Maharishi.

==== Sound therapy ====
A form of classical Indian music called Maharishi Gandharva Veda is purported to integrate and harmonize the cycles and rhythms of the listener's body. Gandharva Veda is an upaveda and is codified in a number of texts that came to be known collectively at Gandharva Veda, an auxiliary text attached to Sama Veda. Mukund Lath writes that Gandharva Veda is a sacred corpus of music, derived from the still more ancient sama, a sacred Vedic form of music. Compact discs of the music are published by the Maharishi University of Management Press.

Listening to recitation in Sanskrit from a specific branch of the vedic literature that corresponds to the appropriate area of the body as determined by a MVAH expert.

== Health Centers ==
The Raj, a Maharishi Ayurveda health spa in Maharishi Vedic City, Iowa.

According to the movement's Global Good News website, there are 23 Maharishi Vedic Health Centres in 15 countries. In 2011, the Maharishi Ayurveda Hospital in New Delhi, India became the first ayurvedic hospital in Northern India to receive accreditation from the National Hospital Accreditation Board of Hospitals (NABH). The Raj is a health spa in Maharishi Vedic City, Iowa. Deepak Chopra founded the spa in 1987 and was its medical director. Ayurvedic spas have also been established in two locations in Germany: Bad Ems in Rhineland-Palatinate, and Bissendorf in Lower Saxony.

== Training ==
Courses to train physicians, nurses and health professionals in the principles and practices of Maharishi Ayurveda are offered by the Maharishi Ayur-Veda Association of America (MAAA) in various locations in the USA. These courses include Continuing Medical Education credit. The faculty and curriculum committee of the MAAA include: Stuart Rothenberg, Robert Schneider, Walter Moelk, Nancy Lonsdorf, Richard Averbach, Gary Kaplan, and Vaidya Manohar Palakurthi. Courses are offered in conjunction with the Scripps Center for Integrative Medicine in La Jolla, California.

Courses in Maharishi Ayur-Veda for health professionals are also conducted at the Maharishi College of Perfect Health, International Maharishi Ayur-Veda Training Centre at MERU, Holland. These courses include: post graduate training, Maharishi Aroma Therapy, Maharishi Light Therapy with Gems, Maharishi Ayur-Veda Health Educator, Vedic Mind-Body program and Presentation of Medical Research. The faculty includes Rainer Picha, Walter Mölk, Robert Keith Wallace, Roswitha Margarete Geelvink-Tradel, and Bob Apon.

The Maharishi College of Vedic Medicine was located at 2721 Arizona Street, NE Albuquerque, New Mexico in the 1990s and 2000s. There is now a campus in San Diego.

== Origin of Ayurveda and its relationship to Maharishi Ayurveda ==
Maharishi Ayur-Veda is described as a modern restoration of the holistic perspective of the original texts of Ayurveda found in the Vedas. In MVAH, the Veda is said to be an "abstract blueprint of creation". The knowledge and technologies of MVAH are based on the understanding that the order displayed throughout the entire universe, including within the human physiology, is governed by a fundamental underlying intelligence. According to the Maharishi, illness comes about when there is a lack of coordination between the body's inner intelligence and its outer expression.

As with traditional Ayurveda, Maharishi Ayur Veda describes material creation according to panchamahābhūtas theory, in which the five elements of earth, air, fire, water and ether combine to form three doṣas: vāta, pitta and kapha. The theory of both traditional and Maharishi Ayurveda is that the body's function is governed by the three doṣas, which designate body types and the physical and mental traits they typify. An individual's doṣa contains various combinations of vāta, pitta and kapha, which can vary with the seasons and time of day. Disease symptoms are attributed to imbalances in one's doṣa, which can be detected through pulse diagnosis or a questionnaire. Balance is achieved through a variety of products and procedures, many of which are specific to one's doṣa. Maharishi Ayur-Veda does not stray from these traditional common interpretations of doṣa.

Maharishi Ayur Veda emerges from and consistently reflects the Advaita Vedanta school of Hindu philosophy, and is the upaveda of Atharva Veda. Maharishi Ayur Veda represents itself as representing the entirety of the Ayurvedic tradition.

The practices of Maharishi Ayur-Veda are said to be authentic, though Francis Zimmerman says that they are biased toward gentleness, avoiding violent or painful treatments that were historically part of ayurveda in early India. He also says that Maharishi Ayur-Veda involves an ideological confusion of Ayurvedic categories. In 1985, Maharishi Ayurveda doctors met with outside consultants, who suggested that some traditional Ayurvedic remedies would not be accepted by American consumers. The principal difference between Maharishi Ayur-Veda and traditional Ayurveda is the emphasis on the role of consciousness and the use of Transcendental Meditation, as well as the highlighting of the need to express positive emotions and attuning one's life to the natural rhythms of the body.

Maharishi Ayur Veda also holds that perfect health is a state present within every person, that can be chosen by the individual, and that the physical body is a portal to a "quantum mechanical body" that exists at the subatomic level where matter and energy are one, and that every organ and process in the body has a quantum equivalent. Tony Nader, called Maharajadhiraj Raja Ram, who is the Sovereign Ruler of the Global Country of World Peace, identifies this concept of "quantum healing" with the Maharishi's theories of Vedic Science.

Individual metabolic differences and seasonal variations as described in MAV are an important part of a healthy diet. MAV considers taste and quality to be central features in the classification of foods, and seasonal factors as crucial in determining nutritional needs. MAV also advises use of certain herbal nutritional supplements to maintain optimum health.

Deepak Chopra, founding president of Maharishi Ayur-Veda Products International, Inc (MAPI), the American Association of Ayurvedic Medicine and former medical director of the Maharishi Ayurveda Health Center for Stress Management and Behavioral Medicine, says, according to Stephen Barrett in an article in the journal Alternative Medicine and Ethics, that "If you have happy thoughts, then you make happy molecules. On the other hand, if you have sad thoughts, and angry thoughts, and hostile thoughts, then you make those molecules which may depress the immune system and make you more susceptible to disease." Barrett goes on to say that, while the TM technique and other relaxation techniques may temporarily relieve stress, claims made by Chopra that happy or sad thought may affect the molecular levels of the body and the immune system have no scientific basis.

== Reception ==
According to the book Global and Modern Ayurveda, while Maharishi Ayur-Veda was instrumental in the popularization of Ayurveda in the 1980s and early 1990s, its role in global Ayurveda has now been marginalized. Authors Smith and Wujastyk attribute the virtual disappearance of MAV as an influence in global Ayurveda to the following factors: (i) isolating and describing itself as being authentic, thereby inferring that other forms of Ayurveda are "disbarred from legitimacy"; (ii) raising "its prices stratospherically" for its medicines and treatments, which placed it beyond the means of all but "the most committed and enthusiastic (and wealthy) followers"; and (iii) "become stridently opposed to allopathic medicine". In the same volume, Suzanne Newcombe cites criticism of the commercial nature of Maharishi Ayur-Veda, but says that "Maharishi Ayur-Veda is an important part of the practice of Ayurveda in contemporary society, despite the ideological claims of those who oppose the system." Smith and Wujastyk write that previously it was a requirement that MAV practitioners have a medical degree, but in 2005, all medical doctors with MAV training were replaced by Maharishi Ayurveda practitioners from India.

Author Philip Goldberg writes that Maharishi Ayurveda "attracted attention" due to the "TM movement's aggressive promotion". Author Frederick M. Smith writes that in the UK "the Maharishi organization had a clear marketing plan and a full-time public relations officer up until at least 1992." In 1991, journalist Andrew Skolnick wrote that the TM movement's marketing of Maharishi Ayurveda was a "widespread pattern of misinformation, deception, and manipulation of lay and scientific news media." These were seen as efforts to gain "scientific respectability". According to an article by Ralph Smith, a similar concern was raised in the 1980 book TM and Cult Mania.

=== Chalmers and Davis ===
In October 1991, the Professional Conduct Committee of the British General Medical Council found Roger Chalmers, Dean of Medicine of the unrecognized Maharishi University of Natural Law, Mentmore and Leslie Davis, Dean of Physiology at that institution, guilty of "Serious Professional Misconduct" in connection with their use of Maharishi Ayur-Veda for the treatment of AIDS and HIV, and ordered them erased from the List of Registered Medical Practitioners. (Chalmers was subsequently reinstated.) The Committee found, among other things, that there were no proper and approved clinical trials for the treatments, there was inadequate scientific evidence to support the treatments, that they were prescribing and that they had made false and misleading statements on the value of MAV in the treatment of HIV and AIDS and about the TM-affiliated "World Medical Association for Perfect Health".

Independent tests of the pills prescribed by Chalmers and Davis showed that they had, at best, a negligible effect on HIV, but were 100,000 times more toxic than AZT. According to a 1990 report in The Independent regarding the accusations, the claim that Maharishi Ayurvedic has no side effects "appears to be inaccurate." The article says that separate warnings had been issued in the past on side-effects of both Transcendental Meditation and the Maharishi Ayurvedic diet, such as a warning by the British Dietetic Association on the potential dangers of the Maharishi Ayurvedic diet to AIDS patients. According to Suzanne Newcombe, alternative treatments often receive little attention in the U.K. and MAV was the focus of GMC only because the treatments involved AIDS patients, which she characterized as a vulnerable and controversial group at the time.

=== Sharma and Chopra ===
In 1991, the Journal of the American Medical Association (JAMA) published an article on the benefits of Maharishi Ayur-Veda titled "Letter from New Delhi: Maharishi Ayur-Veda: Modern Insights into Ancient Medicine," authored by Hari Sharma, then of The Ohio State University College of Medicine and now of The Ohio State University College of Medicine's Center for Integrative Medicine, Brihaspati Dev Triguna, of the All India Ayur-Veda Congress, and Deepak Chopra, of the American Association of Ayurvedic Medicine

A subsequent article in JAMA by Andrew A. Skolnick alleged that the authors of the first article had not disclosed their financial ties with organizations that sell the products and services about which they wrote. The article also investigated the marketing practices surrounding Ayur-Veda products and services. It was alleged there was a "widespread pattern of misinformation, deception, and manipulation of lay and scientific news media". It challenged the Sharma et al. claim that Maharishi Ayur-Veda was more cost effective than standard medical care. Additionally, the article reported that in the late 1980s, herbal researcher Tony Nader, at the time a PhD candidate in neuroscience at the Massachusetts Institute of Technology, had been criticized for misrepresenting his research promoting Maharishi Ayurveda Products International (MAPI) herbal products as being sponsored by MIT and Harvard. The article reported that Nader and David Orme-Johnson were criticized by the organizers of the Annual Meeting of the Society for Economic Botany, which was held at the University of Illinois in Chicago in June 1987. According to the organizers, Nader and Orme-Johnson submitted research abstracts for the conference, but the presentation that they made had little to do with the abstracts. Instead it was a promotion for the herbal remedies of MAPI and for Transcendental Meditation. The JAMA article quotes a former TM teacher and chair of the TM center in Washington, D.C., as saying that he had been told to deceive the media.

A letter to the editor by Chopra and Sharma was published in JAMA in October 1991. Chopra and Sharma wrote that many of the criticisms they had received in letters to the editor were inflammatory and had depended heavily on emotional and unfounded charges, without sound scientific backing and few references. They went on to say that the criticisms were directed largely at the TM organization, rather than to the approaches of Maharishi Ayur-Veda. Andrew Skolnick, in a letter to the editor of JAMA, says Chopra and Sharma did not deny and made no apology that they had concealed from JAMA their financial ties to organizations selling and marketing the products and services about which they wrote, and claimed to have no such conflicts of interest on their signed author's form. Skolnick later published an account of how JAMA was deceived. The journal Science summarized the issue as "an ugly episode that has implications for all scientific journals and for scientists who could possibly be construed as having a conflict of interest".

In response, two TM organizations then headed by Deepak Chopra sued Skolnick, JAMA's editor George Lundberg, and the AMA in 1992, seeking an injunction and $194 million in damages. The suit alleged Skolnick's news report on TM's health care products and services was libelous and that it tortuously interfered with their business interests. In August 1992, in a noted decision, the trial court rejected the plaintiff's motion to enjoin JAMA and Skolnick under the Illinois Deceptive Practices Act from publishing statements about them and Maharishi Ayurveda, observing that the plaintiffs did not allege that the statements about them had been false or misleading, and holding that "plaintiffs have little likelihood of prevailing on the merits of their disparagement claim", and that JAMA's and Skolnick's alleged defamatory statements were protected as "fair comment and criticism" on an issue of public concern. Shortly thereafter, the case was dismissed without prejudice in March 1993. In 1997, Newsweek reported that according to Chopra's lawyer the suit was "settled for an undisclosed amount." Newsweek later published a correction and clarified that there was no monetary settlement. Philip Goldberg's 2010 book American Veda says that the lawsuit was settled in 1993.

=== Flint ===
In 1994, Jonie Flint sued Chopra, the Maharishi Ayur-Veda Health Center in Palo Alto California and Brihaspati Dev Triguna over her husband David's death from leukemia. Two months following a visit to the center at which a primordial sound treatment was prescribed by Chopra, Triguna declared Flint cured of leukemia. Flint followed other Maharishi Ayur-Veda treatments at Triguna's directions over a period of nine months, at a cost of more than $10,000, but died of leukemia. Flint was assisted in filing her lawsuit by the National Council Against Health Fraud. Chopra's attorneys said that the suit against him would be dismissed before trial. They said that David Flint was desperate and that Chopra saw him for 45 minutes for spiritual counsel and gave him a primordial sound technique. They also said that Flint signed a form saying that he understood that sound therapy wasn't a substitute for conventional therapies, and that the form Flint signed also absolved Chopra and his organization of responsibility in the event the treatment was unsuccessful.

== Trademarks ==
Maharishi Ayur-Veda, Maharishi Ayurveda, Maharishi University of Management, Maharishi Vedic Approach to Health, Maharishi Vedic Astrology, Maharishi Vedic Medicine, Maharishi Vedic Vibration Technology, and Transcendental Meditation are trademarks licensed to Maharishi Vedic Education Development Corporation.
