= Nancy Lonsdorf =

American author and medical doctor

- Education: Johns Hopkins, Stanford
- Medical career
- Profession: Medical doctor, author
- Field: Ayurveda, Integrative Medicine
- Institutions: The Raj Ayurveda Health Center, Fairfield, Iowa (2000 – 2005) (now in private practice)
- Awards: Atreya Award for Excellence in Ayurveda Practice

Nancy Lonsdorf is an American author and medical doctor who practices Maharishi Ayurveda. She received her training at Johns Hopkins School of Medicine and studied Ayurveda in Europe and India, and is the author of several books on the subject.

== Education ==
Lonsdorf received her M.D. from Johns Hopkins School of Medicine in 1983 and performed her residency training in psychiatry at Stanford University. Lonsdorf has also studied with Ayurvedic physicians in India, Europe and the U.S.

== Career ==
The Chicago Tribune has referred to Lonsdorf as "one of the nation's most prominent Ayurvedic doctors". She has been a speaker at various medical schools including Columbia University Vagelos College of Physicians and Surgeons, Georgetown University Medical Center, Johns Hopkins School of Medicine, George Washington University School of Medicine & Health Sciences, Howard University, and the Uniformed Services University of the Health Sciences.

She is a member of the planning team for the College of Perfect Health at Maharishi University of Management, which plans to grant M.D. and M.S. degrees during a 5-year educational program. She is a contributing editor for Natural Solutions (formerly called Alternative Medicine) magazine and a member of the Scientific Board of Advisors for RateADrug.com. She teaches courses in clinical Ayurveda to health professionals through the Scripps Center for Integrative Medicine in La Jolla, California.

Londsorf reports that she sees "12 patients or less per day" and according to the "Ask The Doctors" web site, has treated more than 10,000 patients since 1986. She says "the great majority of our patients are professionals" including one profiled by author and physician, Andrew Weil.

In 1987, Lonsdorf became the medical director for the Maharishi Ayurveda Medical Center in Washington, D.C., and in 2000, she became the medical director for The Raj Ayurveda Health Center in Maharishi Vedic City, Iowa, a position she held until 2005. In 2011, she received the "Atreya Award for Excellence in Ayurvedic Practice" from the Association of Ayurvedic Professionals of North America, (AAPNA).

Lonsdorf has been featured or cited in a number of periodicals including the Vegetarian Times, Washingtonian (magazine), The Chicago Tribune, LA Times, the Yoga Journal, Redbook magazine, Rodale's Yogalife, FIT magazine, Natural Health, and Women's Health. Lonsdorf has also appeared on National Public Radio, Voice of America, TV-MD (PBS), the Geraldo Rivera show, CNN and The Donahue Show.

== Publications ==
Lonsdorf has authored several books and videos on Maharishi Ayurveda and its relationship to women's health.

=== Books ===
- Lonsdorf, Nancy; Veronica Butler; Brown, Melanie (1995). A Woman's Best Medicine: Health, Happiness, and Long Life Through Maharishi Ayur-Veda. New York: Jeremy P. Tarcher. ISBN 0-87477-785-2.
- Lonsdorf, Nancy; Butler, Veronica and Brown, Melanie (2001) Ayurveda für Frauen Gesundheit, Glück und langes Leben durch indische Medizin Language: German, Publisher: München Droemer Knaur
- Lonsdorf, Nancy (2002) 2002A woman's best medicine for menopause : your personal guide to radiant good health using Maharishi Ayurveda, Chicago: Contemporary Books
- Lonsdorf, Nancy; Brown, Melanie and Butler, Veronica (2002) Nejlepší medicína pro ženy : zdraví, štěstí a dlouhověkost za pomoci Maharišiho ájurvédy Language: Czech, Publisher: Praha : Dobra,
- Lonsdorf, Nancy (2004). The Ageless Woman: Natural Health and Beauty After Forty with Maharishi Ayurveda. MCD Century Publications. ISBN 0-9721233-5-0.
- Lonsdorf, Nancy (2008) Zralá žena : menopauza a ájurvéda : přirozená cesta ke zdraví, kráse a harmonii Language: Czech, Publisher: Praha : Triton, 2008

== Videography ==
- Lonsdorf, Nancy (1988) On creating health : eliminating stress and reversing aging Maharishi Ayur-Veda Association of America.; Global Video Productions, Publisher: Lancaster, MA : Global Video Productions
- Lonsdorf, Nancy; Bassick, Jane; Guth, Jamie; Weil, Andrew; Northrup, Christiane and Kronenberg, Fredi (1995) Alternative health (medicine), Publisher: Sherborn, MA: Aquarius Productions, Inc.
