= Tony Nader =

Lebanese neurologist (born 1955)

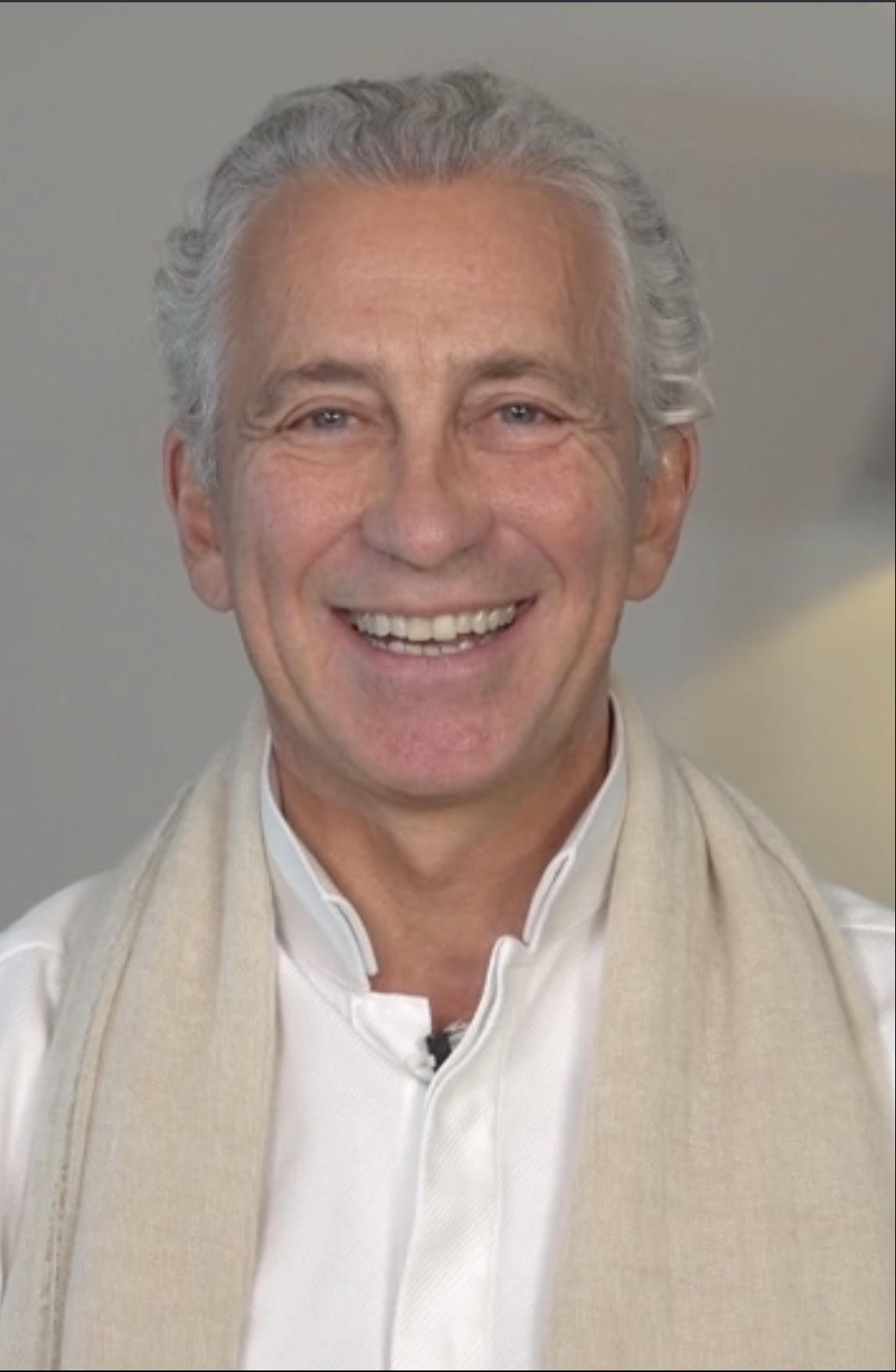
- Nader in 2020
- Born: Tanios Abou Nader; January 10, 1955 (age 71); Lebanon
- Education: American University of Beirut; Massachusetts Institute of Technology
- Occupations: Neuroscientist; university president; author; leader of the Transcendental Meditation movement
- Title: President of Maharishi International University
- Website: drtonynader.com

Tony Nader (Born: Tanios Abou Nader; Arabic: طوني أبو ناضر) is a Lebanese neuroscientist, researcher, university president, author and leader of the Transcendental Meditation movement. He has a medical degree in internal medicine, received his Ph.D. from Massachusetts Institute of Technology and worked as a clinical and research fellow at a teaching hospital of Harvard Medical School.

Nader began work at the Maharishi Ayurveda Health Center in 1987 and in 1994, published his first book, Human Physiology: Expression of Veda and the Vedic literature. Since October 2024, Nader has served as the sixth president of Maharishi International University in Fairfield, Iowa.

In 2000, Nader received the title of First Sovereign Ruler of the conceptual country Global Country of World Peace from Transcendental Meditation founder Maharishi Mahesh Yogi, and in 2008, was named the Maharishi's successor. Nader published his second book, Ramayan In Human Physiology in 2011. In 2015 Nader founded the International Journal of Mathematics and Consciousness and is serving as the editor-in-chief.

== Education ==
Nader attended the American University of Beirut, where he studied internal medicine and psychiatry and received his master's degree and a medical degree in internal medicine and psychiatry. He earned his Ph.D. from the Massachusetts Institute of Technology (MIT) in the field of Brain and Cognitive Science and became a visiting physician at their Clinical Research Center. His post-doctoral work was as a clinical and research fellow at the Massachusetts General Hospital, a teaching hospital of Harvard Medical School.

== Career ==
Nader has conducted research in hormonal activity, neurochemistry, neuroendocrinology, on the medical role of the neurotransmitter and on the relationship between age, behavior, diet, seasonal influences and mood. Nader claims that his desire to have a complete understanding of the mind and body and its relationship to consciousness and the human physiology led him to a "spiritual awakening" and the study of Vedic science with the Maharishi. Nader said he learned about "the field of spiritual or non-physical, or non-material and how it expresses itself in the universe" from the Maharishi. As a professor and director, Nader has conducted Maharishi Vedic Approach to Health programs and lectured in "more than 50 countries".

In 1987, Nader worked at the Maharishi Ayurveda Health Center in Lancaster, Massachusetts.

In his 1994 book Human Physiology: Expression of Veda and the Vedic Literature, Nader postulated a one-to-one correlation of structure and function between 40 aspects of Vedic literature and 40 parts of human physiology. He also said he discovered similarities between the astrological influence of the planets and parts of the human brain. This body of work is reported to have been "derived from" the Maharishi's ideas and Nader's own training in brain physiology. In May 1995, Nader was a keynote speaker at Maharishi University of Management and presented his "recent discovery of how Natural Law manages the physiology and the application of this knowledge to prevent and eliminate problems." The book has been described as an attempt at documenting the scientific basis of the Maharishi's "interpretation of Advaita Vedanta and thus the Vedas … by relating neuroanatomy and neurophysiology to Vedic astrology and philosophy".

Nader performed the first research on Maharishi Vedic Vibration Technology (MVVT), which aims "to enliven the inner intelligence of the body and restore proper functioning" through the use of Vedic sounds. Nader's studies were conducted in Berlin, Paris, and Valkenburg, testing the effectiveness of one session of MVVT in people with disorders that included arthritis, asthma, and gastrointestinal disorders.During a four-day Vedic ceremony in October 2000, Nader was honored by Maharishi as Maharaja (great king) Adhiraj Rajaraam and given responsibility for the Global Country of World Peace and, in 2008, became the Maharishi's successor.

During these transitions, Nader was reportedly given various titles including "Vishwa Prashasak Raja Raam", "Adhi Raam", and "Raja Nader Raam". In 2002, Nader was invited by the mayor of Maharishi Vedic City to take residence at The Mansion Hotel, which serves as the capital of the conceptual Global Country of World Peace. In 2008, a spokesman said Nader would reign in silence and communicate through his governing council.

=== Recent writing ===
In Consciousness Is All There Is (2024), Nader argues that consciousness is fundamental to reality rather than a product of brain activity. Reviewing the book, Bhushan Patwardhan praised its exposition but criticized its limited engagement with philosophical frameworks outside the Vedic tradition.

Nader's The Power of Caring (2026) examines caring as a deliberate practice involving attention and self-awareness. In a review for The Week, Kanu Sarda discussed the book's distinction between sympathy and conscious caring, and its application to personal relationships and public life.

Nader published his second book, called Ramayan In Human Physiology in 2011, documenting the correlation between the characters, relationships, locations, and events of the Valmiki Ramayana with the structures and functions of human physiology. Nader says that his study does not conclude that the Ramayana belongs to any one religion or race or belief system. Rather, the Ramayana is the story of Natural Law and how it unfolds in every individual and the universe. In 2012, Nader was the keynote speaker on a tour of 10 cities in North American, entitled "A New Paradigm: Veda, Consciousness, the Ramayana, and the Self". His presentation in Chicago to 650 Indian Americans received a standing ovation. During the tour, Nader gave presentations on “Embodying Totality” and “Introductory Seminar on the Ramayan in Human Physiology".

In 2026, Nader and Alan R. Madry published an article in the Journal of Consciousness Studies presenting a Vedantic idealist account of consciousness and the mind–body problem.

== Personal life ==
Born and raised in Lebanon, Nader is also a French citizen. He discovered Transcendental Meditation as a pre-med student and through it was able to overcome the trauma of war that he had experienced growing up during a civil war in Lebanon.

== Publications ==
- (1995) and (2000) Maharishi Vedic University, Human Physiology: Expression of Veda and the Vedic Literature (ISBN 9788175230170).
- Nader, Tony (1995). La découverte du Veda et de la littérature védique dans la physiologie humaine: la science moderne et la science védique ancienne découvrent les fondements de l'immortalité (in French). Maharishi Vedic University Press. ISBN 9789071750250.
- Nader, Tony (2011). Ramayana in Human Physiology. Maharishi Press Ltd.
- Consciousness Is Primary: Illuminating the Leading Edge of Knowledge, proceedings of the 2012 faculty symposium at Maharishi University of Management, with commentary by Nader.
- Nader, Tony (2021). One Unbounded Ocean of Consciousness: Simple Answers to the Big Questions in Life (Ebook). Penguin Random House Grupo Editorial Argentina. ISBN 9789877352559.
- Nader, Tony (2024). Consciousness Is All There Is: How Understanding and Experiencing Consciousness Will Transform Your Life. Hay House. ISBN 9781401976507.
- Nader, Tony (2026). The Power of Caring: Who Cares, Why It Matters, and How Conscious Caring Creates a Fulfilling and Connected Life. Hay House. ISBN 9798318617461.

=== Academic papers ===
- Nader, Tony (2015). "Consciousness Is All There Is: A Mathematical Approach with Applications" (PDF). International Journal of Mathematics and Consciousness. 1 (1): 1–65. Archived from the original (PDF) on 12 February 2021.
- Nader, Tony; Madry, Alan R. (2026). "Vedantic Idealism, the Structural Dynamics of Universal Consciousness, and the Mind–Body Problem". Journal of Consciousness Studies. 33 (5–6): 78–104. doi:10.53765/20512201.33.5.078.
