= Traditional Mongolian medicine =

Traditional medicine developed by Mongolians

Traditional Mongolian medicine developed over many years among the Mongolian people. Mongolian medical practice spread across their empire and became an ingrained part of many other peoples’ medical systems.

== History ==
The Mongols were part of a wider network of Eurasian people who had developed a medical system of their own, including the Chinese, Korean, Tibetan, Indian, Uighur, Islamic, and Nestorian Christians. They took the medical knowledge of these people, adapted it to develop their own medical system and at the same time organized an exchange of knowledge between the different people in their empire. On their journeys throughout Asia, the Mongols brought with them a team of doctors. Usually foreign, these doctors themselves had brought medical knowledge from other people in Asia to the Mongol court. They serve three purposes on the journeys on which the accompanied Mongol princes. Their first purpose was to be the personal physicians of the princes in case they required medical attention. The second was to observe and obtain any new medical knowledge from the various groups of people that they encounter. Finally, they were to also spread the medical knowledge that the Mongols had put together to the peoples they encountered. The Mongols were also able to contribute new or more advanced knowledge on topics such as bone setting and treatments of war wounds because of their nomadic lifestyle. The Mongols were the first people to establish a link between diet and health.

Traditional Mongolian doctors were known as shaman, or holy men. They relied on magic and spiritual powers to cure illness. They were called on to determine whether the illness was caused by natural means or because of malicious wishes. Though they were often used as healers, their main strength was in prophecy readings. Foreign physicians who used herbs to treat illness were distinguished from the shamans by their name, otochi, which meant herb user or physician. It was borrowed from the Uighur word for physician, which was otachi. When Mongolian medicine began to transition to using herbs and other drugs and had the service of foreign doctors, the importance of shamans as medical healers began to decline.

Hu Sihui (1314–1330) was a court therapist and dietitian during Mongol Yuan Dynasty reign in China. He is known for his book Yinshan Zhengyao (Important Principles of Food and Drink), that became a classic in Chinese medicine and Chinese cuisine. He was the first to empirically discover and clearly describe deficiency diseases.

== Treatment practices ==
=== Animal blood ===
Animal blood was used to treat a variety of illness, from gout to blood loss. Recorded in the Yuan Shih, are many incident where the blood of a freshly killed animal, usually a cow or an ox, was used to treat illness. Gout, which was a common affliction of the Mongol people, was treated by immersing the afflicted body part into the belly of a freshly killed cow. Placing a person in the stomach of an animal was also used as a method of blood transfusion. On the battlefield, when a soldier became unconscious due to massive amount of blood loss, he would be stripped and placed into the stomach of a freshly killed animal until he became conscious again. In less severe cases, the skin of a freshly killed ox was combined with the masticated grass found in a cow's stomach to form a sort of bandage and ointment to heal battle wounds. It was believed that the stomach and fat of the freshly killed animal could absorb the bad blood and restore the wounded to health.

=== Minerals ===
Mongolian medical literature mentions the use of minerals in medicine, usually in the form of powdered metals or stones. From the Chinese, Mongolians also used cinnabar or mercury sulfide as treatment options, despite the high number of casualties it caused. Both the Chinese and the Mongols believed that cinnabar and mercury sulfide were the elixir of life.

=== Herbs ===
Herbs were the mainstay of Mongolian medicine; legend had it that any plant could be used as a medicine. An emchi is quoted as saying:

All those flowers, on which butterflies sit, are ready medicine for various diseases. One can eat such flowers without any hesitation. A flower rejected by the butterflies is poisonous, but it can become medicine, when it is properly composed.

=== Acupuncture and moxibustion ===
The Mongolian adopted the practice of acupuncture from the Chinese. They adapted this tradition and made it a Mongolian form of treatment when they burned herbs over the various meridian points rather than used a needle. The tradition of Moxibustion (burning mugwort over acupuncture points) was developed in Mongolia and later incorporated into Tibetan medicine.

=== Water ===
One unusual aspect of Mongolian medicine is the use of water as a medicine. Water was collected from any source, including the sea, and stored for many years until ready for use. Acidity and other stomach upsets were said to be amenable to water treatments.

=== Bone setting ===
Bone setting is a branch of Mongolian medicine carried out by Bariachis, specialist bone setters. They work without medicines, as anesthetics or instruments. Instead they rely on physiotherapy to manipulate bones back to their proper position. This was done without any pain to the patient. Bariachis are laypeople, without medical training, and are born into the job, following the family tradition. They had the ability to fix any bone problem, no matter how severe or difficult. When Chinese physicians were brought into the Mongolian empire, Wei Yilin, a famous Yuan orthopedic surgeon established particular methods for setting fractures and treating shoulder, hip, and knee dislocations. He also pioneered the suspension method for joint reduction. He was not only an orthopedic surgeon but also an anesthesiologist who used various folk medicine for anesthetics during his operations. It appears that this traditional practice is in decline, and that no scientific research has been carried out into it.

== Pulse diagnosis ==
Pulse diagnosis is very popular in Western Asia and especially Iran, and its introduction to the Islamic West can be traced back to the Mongols. The Mongol word for pulse, mai, has Chinese etymology. In China, pulse diagnosis was related to the balance between the yin and yang. Irregular pulses were believed to be caused by an imbalance of the yin and the yang. However, when the Mongol adopted this medical practice, they believed that the pulse was directly related to moral order and that when the moral order was chaotic, so the pulse would be chaotic and irregular as well. This belief is highlighted in a story recounted in the Yuan Shih. In 1214, Ogodei Qa'an had an irregular pulse, and was very ill. His most trusted physician ordered that a general amnesty be declared all across the empire. Shortly afterwards, Ogodei Qa'an was restored to health and his pulse regular once again. For the Mongol, this account gives evidence to the direct relationship between pulse and moral order. Pulse diagnosis soon became the primary diagnosis' tool and became the cornerstone of Mongolian medicine. Qubilai decreed that Chinese manuals on pulse-based medicine be translated to Mongolian. His successor, Temür, in 1305, ordered that pulse diagnosis be one of the ten compulsory subjects in which Imperial Academy of Medicine medical students be tested. In pulse diagnosis, there was a distinction between measuring a child's pulse versus and adult's pulse, and this distinction was greatly emphasized in the Chinese texts that were translated, and later in the Mongolian texts.

== Discovery of the link between diet and health ==
In 1330, Hu Sihui, a Mongolian physician published Yinshan Zhengyo (Important Principles of Food and Drink). It was the first book of its kind. In this textbook, Hu Sihui preached the importance of a balanced diet with a focus on moderation, especially in drinking. He also listed beneficial properties of various common foods, including fish, shellfish, meat, fruit, vegetables, and 230 cereals. Grapes were recommended for character strengthening and boosting one's energy levels. However, eating too many apples could cause distension and indulging in too many oranges lead to liver damage. A common menu item, dog meat, was very beneficial because it calmed the liver, spleen, heart, lungs, kidneys, and pericardium. This link between diet and health was spread far and wide by the Mongols on their journeys across the Eurasian steppe lands.

=== Dom ===
Dom is the tradition of household cures, many based simply on superstition – one instance being that a picture of a fox hung over a child's bed will help it sleep. Counting the frequency of breathing is also stated to be a relief for psychological problems and distress.

== Eating papers ==
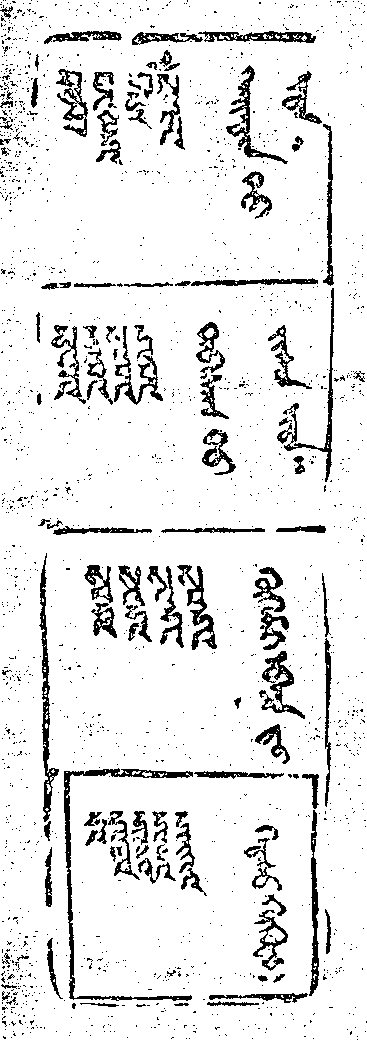
Strip of Mongolian eating papers with Tibetan (left) and Mongolian (right) text

A printing stock found in eastern Mongolia in the 1920s documents a historical custom of eating a piece of paper with words printed on it, in order to prevent or heal maladies. On fields of about 24x29 mm magical incantations in Tibetan are printed, along with use instructions in Mongolian. The practise apparently was part of lamaist popular medicine.

== Traditional Mongolian medicine today ==
Today Mongolia is one of the few countries which officially supports its traditional system of medicine.

Since 1949, the Chinese government has steadily promoted advances in Mongolian medical care, research and education. In 1958 the Department of Traditional Chinese and Mongolian Medicine at the Inner Mongolia Medical College opened its doors to students. In 2007 it expanded, opening a state of the art campus just outside Hohhot City. The Chinese government has also established scores of Mongolian medicine hospitals since 1999, including 41 in Inner Mongolia, 3 in Xinjiang, and 1 each in Liaoning, Heilongjiang, Gansu and Qinghai.

== See also ==
- List of branches of alternative medicine
- Pharmacognosy
- Traditional Chinese medicine
- Traditional Tibetan medicine
