= Stuart McRobert =

Stuart McRobert (born 1958 in England) is a writer on strength training, best known as the founder and publisher of Hardgainer magazine.

== Biography ==
McRobert started weight training at age 15, and began writing articles on weight training while attending college in Liverpool, England. His first article was published in Iron Man magazine, in July, 1981. McRobert moved to Cyprus in 1983, teaching at an English language school in Nicosia.

McRobert founded CS Publishing, and began publishing Hardgainer in July, 1989. He continued publishing the magazine until June, 2004. Despite no longer publishing the magazine, he continues to operate the Hardgainer web site and his book publishing operation. In addition to Hardgainer, McRobert has published numerous articles in popular bodybuilding magazines such as Iron Man.

He has written several popular books:

- Brawn (1991)
- The Insider's Tell-All Handbook On Weight-Training Technique (1996)
- Beyond Brawn (1998)
- Further Brawn (2001)
- Build Muscle, Lose Fat, Look Great (2006)

=== Training philosophy ===
McRobert is focused on strength training for the so-called "hardgainer"; someone who is not a natural athlete (i.e. the vast majority of trainees). He feels that most of the workouts that are published in the bodybuilding press and magazines are not effective for normal people (without genetic advantages and/or the use of steroids) and will either be ineffective or induce injury if attempted.

McRoberts emphasizes strict, correct form for lifts to avoid the possibility of injury, and his publications are exhaustively detailed about correct and incorrect forms. Trainees are also encouraged to use only weights that allow strict form to be maintained. Routines are also to be entered into gradually, again to prevent injury. McRobert also endorses Active Release Techniques and Trigger Point Therapy between workouts to minimize discomfort and injury. In his latest book he also espouses the benefits of yoga to improve flexibility.

== Personal life ==
McRobert lives in Nicosia, Cyprus with his wife and two daughters.
