= Transcendental Meditation =

Form of mantra meditation

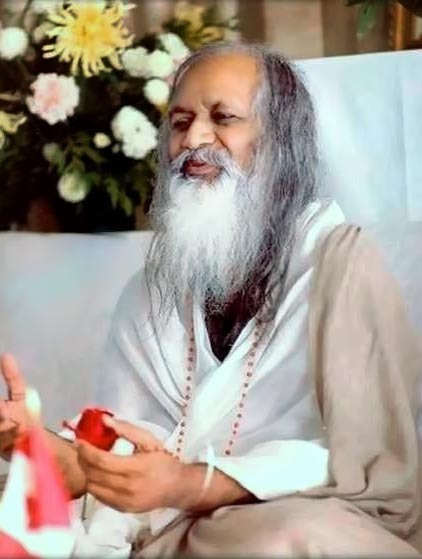
Maharishi Mahesh Yogi, developer of the Transcendental Meditation technique.

Transcendental Meditation (TM) is a form of silent meditation developed by Maharishi Mahesh Yogi. The TM technique involves the silent repetition of a mantra or sound, and is practiced for 15–20 minutes twice per day. It is taught through a standard course of instruction, with a cost which varies by country and individual circumstance. According to the TM organization, it is a non-religious method that promotes relaxed awareness, stress relief, self-development, and higher states of consciousness.

The Maharishi began teaching the technique in India in the mid-1950s. Building on the teachings of his master, the Advaita Vedanta monk Brahmananda Saraswati (known honorifically as Guru Dev), the Maharishi taught thousands of people during a series of world tours from 1958 to 1965, expressing his teachings in spiritual and religious terms. TM became more popular in the 1960s and 1970s as the Maharishi shifted to a more secular presentation, and his meditation technique was practiced by celebrities, most prominently members of the Beatles and the Beach Boys. At this time, he began training TM teachers. The worldwide TM organization grew to include educational programs, health products, and related services. Following the Maharishi's death in 2008, leadership of the TM organization passed to neuroscientist Tony Nader.

Related organizations such as the Global Country of World Peace and the David Lynch Foundation have promoted TM. The technique has been variously described as both religious and non-religious, with the United States Court of Appeals for the Third Circuit notably upholding the federal ruling that TM was essentially "religious in nature" and therefore could not be taught in public schools. (Note: Sociologists, religion scholars, and a New Jersey judge and court are among those who have expressed views on it being religious or non-religious. The United States Court of Appeals for the Third Circuit upheld the federal ruling that TM was essentially "religious in nature" and therefore could not be taught in public schools.) The TM movement has received criticism for allegedly disguising religious claims in pseudo-scientific language.

Research on TM began in the 1970s. Studies suggest that TM has a comparable effect on general psychological wellbeing as other meditation techniques. TM practice may lower blood pressure, an effect comparable with other lifestyle interventions.

== History ==
The Transcendental Meditation program and the Transcendental Meditation movement originated with their founder Maharishi Mahesh Yogi, and continued beyond his death in 2008. In 1955, "the Maharishi began publicly teaching a traditional meditation technique" learned from his master Brahmananda Saraswati that he called Transcendental Deep Meditation and later renamed Transcendental Meditation. The Maharishi initiated thousands of people, then developed a TM teacher training program as a way to accelerate the rate of bringing the technique to more people. He also inaugurated a series of tours that started in India in 1955, and went international in 1958 which promoted Transcendental Meditation. These factors, coupled with endorsements by celebrities who practiced TM and claims that scientific research had validated the technique, helped to popularize TM in the 1960s and 1970s. In 1984, the phrase "Transcendental Meditation" was trademarked by the Maharishi Foundation, LTD. By the late 2000s, TM had been taught to millions of individuals and the Maharishi was overseeing a large multinational movement. Despite organizational changes and the addition of advanced meditative techniques in the 1970s, the Transcendental Meditation technique has remained relatively unchanged.

Among the first organizations to promote TM were the Spiritual Regeneration Movement, and the International Meditation Society. In modern times, the movement has grown to encompass schools and universities that teach the practice, and includes many associated programs based on the Maharishi's interpretation of the Vedic traditions. In the U.S., non-profit organizations included the Students International Meditation Society, AFSCI, World Plan Executive Council, Maharishi Vedic Education Development Corporation, Global Country of World Peace, Transcendental Meditation for Women, and Maharishi Foundation. The successor to Maharishi Mahesh Yogi, and leader of the Global Country of World Peace, is Tony Nader.

== Technique ==
The meditation practice involves a silently-used, individually assigned mantra for 15–20 minutes twice per day while sitting with the eyes closed. It is reported to be one of the most widely practiced, and among the most widely researched meditation techniques, with hundreds of published research studies. The technique is made available worldwide by certified TM teachers in a seven-step course, and fees vary from country to country. Beginning in 1965, the Transcendental Meditation technique has been incorporated into selected schools, universities, corporations, and prison programs in the US, Latin America, Europe, and India. In 1977, a US district court ruled that a curriculum in TM and the Science of Creative Intelligence (SCI) being taught in some New Jersey schools was religious in nature and in violation of the First Amendment of the United States Constitution. The technique has since been included in a number of educational and social programs around the world.

The Transcendental Meditation technique has been described as both religious and non-religious, as an aspect of a new religious movement, as rooted in Hinduism, and as a non-religious practice for self-development.

The public presentation of the TM technique over its 50-year history has been praised for its high visibility in the mass media and effective global propagation, and criticized for using celebrity and scientific endorsements as a marketing tool. Also, advanced courses supplement the TM technique and include an advanced meditation program called the TM-Sidhi program, the unveiling of which created media controversy and a time of crisis for the movement's image.

== Movement ==
The Transcendental Meditation movement consists of the programs and organizations connected with the Transcendental Meditation technique and founded by Maharishi Mahesh Yogi. Transcendental Meditation was first taught in the 1950s in India, and has continued since the Maharishi's death in 2008. The organization was estimated to have 900,000 participants worldwide in 1977, a million by the 1980s, and five million by the time of Maharishi's death in 2008.

Programs include the Transcendental Meditation technique, an advanced meditation practice called the TM-Sidhi program ("Yogic Flying"), an alternative health care program called Maharishi Ayurveda, and a system of building and architecture called Maharishi Sthapatya Ved. The TM movement's past and present media endeavors include a publishing company (MUM Press), a television station (KSCI), a radio station (KHOE), and a satellite television channel (Maharishi Channel). During its 50-year history, its products and services have been offered through a variety of organizations, which are primarily nonprofit and educational. These include the Spiritual Regeneration Movement, the International Meditation Society, World Plan Executive Council, Maharishi Vedic Education Development Corporation, Transcendental Meditation for Women, the Global Country of World Peace, and the David Lynch Foundation.

The TM movement also operates a worldwide network of Transcendental Meditation teaching centers, schools, universities, health centers, herbal supplements, solar panel, and home financing companies, plus several TM-centered communities. The global organization is reported to have an estimated net worth of USD 3.5 billion. The TM movement has been characterized in a variety of ways and has been called a spiritual movement, a new religious movement, a millenarian movement, a world affirming movement, a new social movement, a guru-centered movement, a personal growth movement, a religion, and a cult. Additional sources contend that TM and its movement are not a cult. Participants in TM programs are not required to adopt a belief system; it is practiced by atheists, agnostics and people from a variety of religious affiliations. The organization has been the subject of controversies that includes being labelled a cult by several parliamentary inquiries or anti-cult movements in the world.

Some notable figures in pop-culture practicing TM include the Beatles, the Beach Boys, Kendall Jenner, Hugh Jackman, Tom Hanks, Jennifer Lopez, Mick Jagger, Eva Mendez, Moby, David Lynch, Jennifer Aniston, Nicole Kidman, Eric André, Jerry Seinfeld, Howard Stern, Julia Fox, Clint Eastwood, Martin Scorsese, Russell Brand, Nick Cave, Nikki Sixx and Oprah Winfrey.

== Health effects ==
=== History of the research ===
The first studies of the health effects of Transcendental Meditation appeared in the early 1970s.

As of 2004, the US government had given more than $20 million to Maharishi International University to study the effect of meditation on health.

=== Research ===
A 2012 review suggested firm conclusions about the effects of TM cannot be made based on existing research due to the often low quality of relevant research studies, including lack of controls and potential for researcher bias.

A 2012 meta-review found that TM has overall effects "comparable" with other meditation techniques. TM might perform better in reducing negative emotions, trait anxiety, and neuroticism and improving markers of learning, memory, and self-actualization, but performs more poorly in reducing negative personality traits, reducing stress, improving attention and mindfulness and cognition, in comparison with other meditation approaches.

A 2013 statement from the American Heart Association said that TM could be considered as a treatment for hypertension, although other interventions such as exercise and device-guided breathing were more effective and better supported by clinical evidence.

TM may reduce blood pressure according to a 2017 review that compared TM to control groups. A trend over time indicates practicing TM may lower blood pressure. Such effects are comparable to other lifestyle interventions. Conflicting findings may be due to poorly designed studies, which can produce biased results.

A 2021 review found TM can help slightly reduce blood pressure for up to 3 months, after which the effect wanes. Effects were more pronounced in patients over 65 than in younger patients.

== Views and claims ==
=== Views on consciousness (1963) ===
In his 1963 book, The Science of Being and Art of Living, Maharishi Mahesh Yogi says that, over time, through the practice of the TM technique, the conscious mind gains familiarity with deeper levels of the mind, bringing the subconscious mind within the capacity of the conscious mind, resulting in expanded awareness in daily activity. He also teaches that the Transcendental Meditation practitioner transcends all mental activity and experiences the 'source of thought', which is said to be pure silence, 'pure awareness' or 'transcendental Being', 'the ultimate reality of life'. TM is sometimes self described as a technology of consciousness. According to author Michael Phelan, "The fundamental premise of the psychology of fulfillment is that within every person exists a seemingly inexhaustible center of energy, intelligence, and satisfaction... To the extent that our behavior depends on the degree of energy and intelligence available to us, this center of pure creative intelligence may be described as that resource which gives direction to all that we experience, think and do."

According to the Maharishi, there are seven levels of consciousness: (i) deep sleep; (ii) dreaming; (iii) waking; (iv) transcendental consciousness; (v) cosmic consciousness; (vi) God consciousness; and, (vii) unity consciousness. The Maharishi says that transcendental consciousness can be experienced through Transcendental Meditation, and that those who meditate regularly over time could become aware of cosmic consciousness. An indication of cosmic consciousness is "ever present wakefulness" present even during sleep. Research on long-term TM practitioners experiencing what they describe as cosmic consciousness, has identified unique EEG profiles, muscle tone measurements, and REM indicators that suggest physiological parameters for this self described state of consciousness. However, the Cambridge Handbook of Consciousness notes that it is premature to say that the EEG coherence found in TM is an indication of a higher state of consciousness..

=== Science of Creative Intelligence (1971) ===
In 1961, the Maharishi created the "International Meditation Society for the Science of Creative Intelligence". In 1971 the Maharishi inaugurated "Maharishi's Year of Science of Creative Intelligence" and described SCI as the connection of "modern science with ancient Vedic science". Author Philip Goldberg describes it as Vedanta philosophy that has been translated into scientific language. A series of international symposiums on the Science of Creative Intelligence (SCI) were held between 1970 and 1973 and were attended by scientists and "leading thinkers", including Buckminster Fuller, Melvin Calvin, a Nobel Prize winner in chemistry, Hans Selye, Marshal McLuhan and Jonas Salk. These symposiums were held at universities such as Humboldt State University and University of Massachusetts. The following year, the Maharishi developed a World Plan to spread his teaching of SCI around the world.

The theoretical part of SCI is taught in a 33-lesson video course. In the early 1970s, the SCI course was offered at more than 25 American universities including Stanford University, Yale University, the University of Colorado, the University of Wisconsin, and Oregon State University. Until 2009, Maharishi University of Management (MUM) required its undergraduate students to take SCI classes, and both MUM and Maharishi European Research University (MERU) in Switzerland have awarded degrees in the field. The Independent reports that children at Maharishi School learn SCI principles such as "the nature of life is to grow" and "order is present everywhere". SCI is reported to be part of the curriculum of TM related lower schools in Iowa, Wheaton, Maryland and Skelmersdale, UK. In 1975 SCI was used as the call letters for a TM owned television station in San Bernardino, California.

==== Pseudoscientific claims ====
The Science of Creative Intelligence is not science. TM has been described by scientists, academics, and skeptics as containing pseudoscientific claims, because it supposedly promises beyond-natural abilities, and for disguising Vedic-Hindu religious ideas as scientific. Theologian Robert M. Price, writing in the Creation/Evolution Journal (the journal of the National Center for Science Education), compares the Science of Creative Intelligence to Creationism. Price says instruction in the Transcendental Meditation technique is "never offered without indoctrination into the metaphysics of 'creative intelligence'". Skeptic James Randi says SCI has "no scientific characteristics." Astrophysicist and sceptic Carl Sagan writes that the "Hindu doctrine" of TM is a pseudoscience. Irving Hexham, a professor of religious studies, describes the TM teachings as "pseudoscientific language that masks its religious nature by mythologizing science".

Sociologists Rodney Stark and William Sims Bainbridge describe the SCI videotapes as largely based on the Bhagavad Gita, and say that they are "laced with parables and metaphysical postulates, rather than anything that can be recognized as conventional science". In 1979, the court case Malnak v Yogi determined that although SCI/TM is not a theistic religion, it deals with issues of ultimate concern, truth, and other ideas analogous to those in well-recognized religions. Maharishi biographer Paul Mason suggests that the scientific terminology used in SCI was developed by the Maharishi as part of a restructuring of his philosophies in terms that would gain greater acceptance and increase the number of people starting the TM technique. He says that this change toward a more academic language was welcomed by many of the Maharishi's American students.

=== Maharishi effect (1974) ===
Maharishi Mahesh Yogi claimed that the quality of life would noticeably improve if at least the square root of one per cent (1%) of the population practised the Transcendental Meditation technique. This is known as the "Maharishi effect" and according to the Maharishi, it was perceived in 1974 after an analysis of crime statistics in 16 cities. With the introduction of the TM-Sidhi program including Yogic Flying, the Maharishi proposed that the square root of 1 per cent of the population (around 6325 people, the square root of 40 million (1% of the global population of about 4 billion people in 1974)) practicing this advanced program together at the same time and in the same place would create benefits in society. This was referred to as the "Extended Maharishi Effect".

Author Ted Karam claims that there have been numerous studies on the Maharishi effect including a gathering of over 4,000 people (just under two thirds of the square root of 1% of the population as of 1974) in Washington, D.C. in the summer of 1993. The effect has been examined in 42 scientific studies. The TM organisation has linked the fall of the Berlin Wall and a reduction in global terrorism, US inflation and crime rates to the Maharishi effect. The Maharishi effect has been endorsed by the former President of Mozambique Joaquim Chissano.

As the theories proposed by TM practitioners are not scientific, the Maharishi effect still lacks a causal basis. Moreover, the evidence has been said to result from cherry-picked data and the credulity of believers. Critics, such as James Randi, have called this research pseudoscience. Randi says that he investigated comments made by former Maharishi International University faculty member Robert Rabinoff in 1978. He spoke to the Fairfield Chief of Police who said local crime levels were the same and the regional Agriculture Department who reportedly deemed that farm yields for Jefferson County matched the state average.

=== Maharishi Vedic Science (1981) ===
The Maharishi proclaimed 1981 as the Year of Vedic Science. It is based on the Maharishi's interpretation of ancient Vedic texts and includes subjective technologies like the Transcendental Meditation technique and the TM-Sidhi program plus programs like Maharishi Sthapatya Veda (MSV) and Maharishi Vedic Astrology (MVA) services which apply Vedic science to day-to-day living. Vedic science studies the various aspects of life and their relationship to the Veda.

== Sources ==
- Reddy, Kumuda; Egenes, Linda (2002). Conquering Chronic Disease Through Maharishi Vedic Medicine. New York: Lantern Books. p. 10. ISBN 978-1-930051-55-3.
- Sharma, Hari (1995). Maharishi Ayur-VedaAn Ancient Health Paradigm in a Modern World. Vol. 1. p. 364. doi:10.1089/act.1995.1.364.
- Wallace, Robert Keith (1993). The physiology of consciousness. Fairfield, Iowa: Maharishi International University Press. pp. 64–66. ISBN 978-0-923569-02-0.
- Wujastyk, Dominik (2003). The Roots of Ayurveda: Selections from Sanskrit Medical Writings. London, New York, etc.: Penguin. ISBN 978-0-14-044824-5.
- Wujastyk, Dagmar; Smith, Frederick M. (2008). Modern and global Ayurveda: Pluralism and Paradigms. Albany: State University of New York Press. ISBN 978-0-7914-7489-1.
