= Vegetarian Times =

American food magazine

- Vegetarian Times February 2010 Issue
- Editor: Brittany Martin
- Categories: Food and lifestyle
- Founded: 1974
- Company: Outside
- Country: USA
- Based in: Boulder, Colorado
- Language: English
- Website: vegetariantimes.com
- ISSN: 0164-8497

Vegetarian Times is an American publication focused on food, culture, health and lifestyle for vegetarians, vegans, and all people interested in plant-based eating. Vegetarian Times promotes an eco-friendly lifestyle with recipes, and healthy food wellness information, cooking techniques, and information on "green" products. Vegetarian Times ceased publishing a print magazine in 2016, and transitioned to a web-only publication by 2017. In 2020, Vegetarian Times was acquired by Pocket Outdoor Media, now known as Outside.

== History ==
After unsuccessfully attempting to sell an article he wrote about vegetarianism entitled "Being a Vegetarian Is Never Having to Say You're Sorry – to a Cow", in 1974 founder Paul Obis (1951–2018) put together a four-page hand-delivered newsletter and called it Vegetarian Times. He made 300 photocopies and from his first issue generated three subscriptions. He launched the newsletter from his apartment in Oak Park, Illinois. Obis grew up in Melrose Park, Illinois, and studied nursing at the University of Illinois at Chicago. He continued working in the field even after starting Vegetarian Times.

In the seventies, the magazine increased in size from 4 pages to 16, to 24 and was published with press runs of 1,000–2,000 copies. By 1977, after around number 19, Vegetarian Times was published bi-monthly and had a readership of 10,000. Overwhelmed with producing and distributing the magazine from his home, in the early 1980s Obis sought a publisher and sold an 80% ownership share to New York publisher Associated Business Publications (ABP) in exchange for assuming $6000 in debt and two bags of unopened mail and agreeing to continue the publication.

APB converted the magazine to a monthly publication schedule and increased advertising from nearly nothing to 15 to 20 pages per issue. The circulation grew eightfold and the revenues grew twenty times to over $1 million. Despite the growth, the periodical continued to lose money. In 1985 ABP acquired a new publication and decided Vegetarian Times would not get the staff attention it needed to become profitable. During the time that ABP owned the magazine, Obis continued on as editor. Obis took the opportunity to buy back his magazine for $276,000 and by 1990 raised circulation to over 250,000 and gross revenues to $10 million. As of the late 1980s, there were no other head-to-head magazine competitors in the United States. Obis' longtime friend, Fred Rogers (aka "Mister Rogers") helped finance the deal and became a minority shareholder, while Obis owned the majority. In 1990, Obis and Rogers sold the magazine to Cowles Media, The owner of the Minneapolis Star Tribune, for $10 million. In 1997, Obis told Newsday that he was no longer a vegetarian.

The magazine has had several changes in ownership since Obis purchased the company. In 1990, Cowles Media acquired Vegetarian Times. In 1999, Sabot Publishing near Richmond, Virginia, purchased the publication from Primedia (now Rent Group), which had owned the magazine for 18 months at the time of its sale. In 2003, the magazine was acquired from Richmond-based Sabot Publishing by Cruz Bay Publishing, a subsidiary of Active Interest Media, which relaunched it in November 2004, the 30th anniversary of the magazine, after significant investment and an editorial overhaul. The magazine expanded coverage to appeal not only to strict vegetarians, but also to people simply looking for a healthy lifestyle and seeking healthy recipes. In 2007, Elizabeth Turner was named Editor-in-Chief. Prior to joining Vegetarian Times, Turner was the Managing Editor of Natural Health magazine. Turner separated from Vegetarian Times in 2015 to become Editor in Chief of Forks Over Knives, a vegan outreach portal associated with the work of T. Colin Campbell and Caldwell Esselstyn.

In 2017 Vegetarian Times became an online magazine: instead of receiving a physical magazine subscribers can access a digital library of recipes as well as online cooking classes. The online website is operated and owned by Active Interest Media (AIM) who specialize in "niche enthusiast magazines".

According to Janeen Obis, widow of Paul Obis, a complete physical set of Vegetarian Times has been donated to Brown University in Providence, Rhode Island.

In 2020, The Vegetarian Times was acquired by Pocket Outdoor Media which rebranded as Outside, Inc. in February, 2021. Brittany Martin was hired to edit Vegetarian Times in the summer of 2021 and has overseen a rebrand and relaunch of the now digital-only publication.

== Past contributors ==
- James Samuel Gordon
- Suzanne Havala Hobbs
- Anya Kamenetz
- Viktoras Kulvinskas
- Nancy Lonsdorf
- Deborah Madison

== Ancillary publications ==
Vegetarian Times Special Publications

In addition to the magazine, Vegetarian Times also periodically published special interest publications such as The Vegetarian Beginner's Guide and recipe compilations such as Healing Foods Cookbook: 25 Foods You Need, 75 Recipes You'll Love.

== See also ==
- List of vegan and plant-based media
- List of food and drink magazines
