= Health Science (magazine) =

National Health Association magazine

Health Science is a quarterly magazine published by the National Health Association (NHA). The magazine was launched in 1977 and focuses on nutrition. Its editor is Mark Huberman, who also serves as the president of the NHA.
