= Healthy Children =

American online health magazine

Healthy Children is an online magazine published quarterly by the American Academy of Pediatrics. The magazine was started in August 2012. Target audience is parents. It publishes topics related to children's health, guidelines on immunization, common illnesses in childhood, issues on behavior and development of children, and recommendations regarding children's fitness and nutrition. The magazine is published in English and Spanish languages.

Healthy Children offers invaluable insights for parents. With thematic issues tailored to the seasons, it addresses essential topics like summer safety, winter family moments and the joys of reading in summer. During times of uncertainty, such as the COVID-19 pandemic, the magazine provides guidance on resilience and self-care. It remains a valuable resource for families, emphasizing children's well-being throughout the year.
