= Global Country of World Peace =

Non-profit organization and micronation

- Formation: 7 October 2000
- Founder: Maharishi Mahesh Yogi

The Global Country of World Peace (GWCP) is a non-profit world government organization that aims to promote transcendental meditation, education, and the construction of "buildings for peace" in the world's major cities. Inaugurated by Maharishi Mahesh Yogi, on 7 October 2000, the GCWP was originally conceived as "a country without borders for peace-loving people everywhere." The organization is run by rajas (kings), initiates who have "spiritual dominion" over an existing nation in accordance with the teachings of the Maharishi and "Divine Intelligence". It has issued a currency called the raam and its leader (the Maharaja, or Great King) is neurologist Tony Nader.

In 2002, the GCWP was incorporated in the state of Iowa, USA with its headquarters in Maharishi Vedic City. It has administrative or educational centres in the U.S., the Netherlands, and Ireland. Since the early 2000s, the GCWP has made unsuccessful effots in establishing a sovereign nation state in locations in Africa, Asia, and Latin America.

== Origins and mission ==
In the 1970s, the Maharishi initiated plans towards a new world government that revolved around his TM teachings (example: Science of Creative Intelligence) and met with world leaders, Canadian prime minister Pierre Trudeau, for talks about this goal. By the 2000s, the Maharishi began making anti-democratic statements in public, announcing his plans for a monarchic government in "every country" based on "the custody of God vested in kings." TM leaders were crowned as "rajas" (kings) of the GCWP, with Tony Nader receiving the highest honor as the "Maharaja" (Great King) and "First Sovereign Ruler of the Global Country of World Peace" Reports indicate that these leaders of the TM movement must pay $1 million to be crowned as "rajas" within the GCWP hierarchy.

According to a report from Bloomberg, the GCWP's tax filings describe its mission as the creation of world peace 'by unifying all nations in happiness prosperity, invincibility, and perfect health'. The mission of the US-based division of the GCWP, according to a 2005 article, is to promote "enlightenment, good health, and peace through the practice of Transcendental Meditation" and to build palaces of peace in 3000 of the world's major cities.

== Administration ==
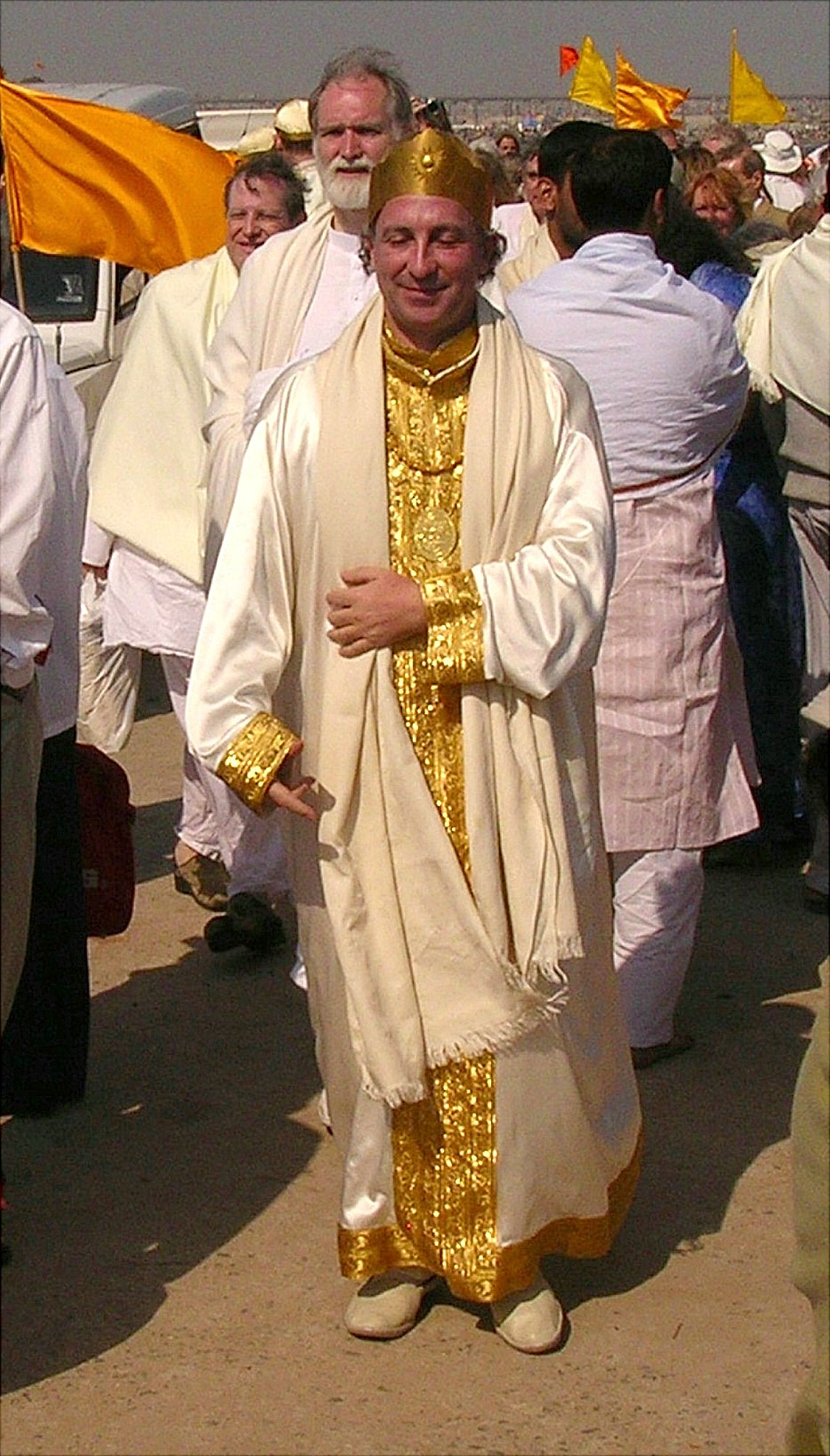
Tony Nader in ceremonial attire as Maharaja of the GCWP.

Regional leaders and 'leading Transcendental Meditators "trained as TM teachers and graduates of the TM-Sidhi program" are called "Governors of the Age of Enlightenment". Tony Nader was appointed by the Maharishi as the "First Sovereign Ruler of the Global Country of World Peace" in 2000.

Some "national leaders" and "top officials" of the Global Country of World Peace are called Rajas. In 2005, 22 male Rajas were appointed by the Maharishi as national and regional leaders of his organization. His Raja training course took about two months and the participants were "advised to make a contribution of $1,000,000 to the Maharishi World Peace Fund." Ceremonial attire for the Maharaja and the rajas includes white silk robes, gold medallions, and gold crowns. In 2008, Nader attended the Maharishi's funeral in India and adopted the title, "Maharaja Adhiraj Rajaraam". Since then the organization has also been administrated by the "high-functioning intellectual elite in its upper echelons," such as Bevan Morris, Maureen Wynne, and Willy Koppel, while retaining Nader as the central leader.

The GCWP, according to its website, has a "ministry" consisting of ministers split into twelve departments: Law and Order, Education, Health, Architecture, Trade and Commerce, Defence, Science and Technology, Communication, Religion and Culture, Administration, and Finance and Planning.

== Efforts to obtain sovereignty ==
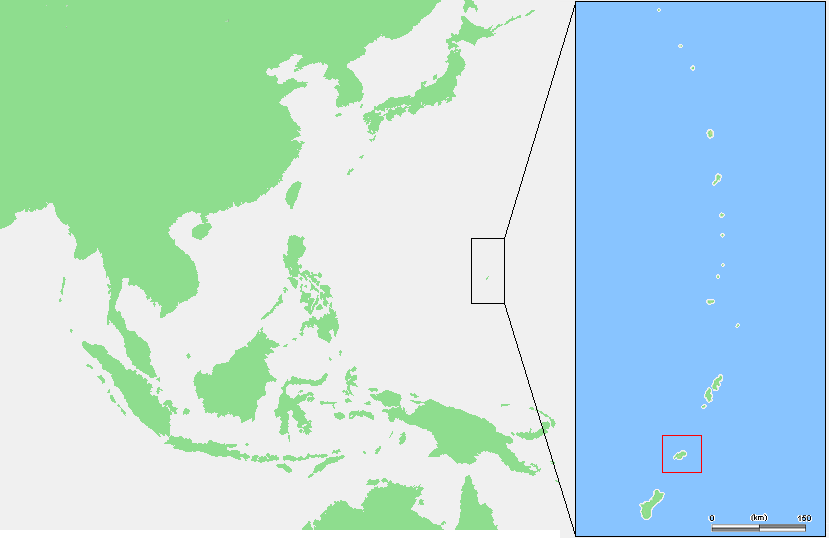
Rota

In 2001, it was reported that the Global Country of World Peace had been unsuccessful in its attempts to establish a sovereign nation after contacting countries in Africa, Asia, and Latin America. In November 2000, the GCWP made a proposal to the President of Suriname, offering $1.3 billion over three years for a 200-year lease of 3,500 acres (14 km^{2}) of rural land plus "1 percent of the money the sovereign state's central bank puts into circulation" and the creation of 10,000 jobs. The UNHCR reported that, in July 2001, the island nation of Tuvalu rejected, after serious consideration, a proposal from the GCWP to create a "Vatican like sovereign city-state" near the international airport in exchange for a payment of $2 million per year.

In 2002, the GCWP asked if they could set up their world headquarters on one hundred acres of land on the 33-square-mile (85 km^{2}) island of Rota which is part of the Commonwealth of the Northern Mariana Islands, a commonwealth of the United States. The GCWP offered to contribute to economic growth of the country but Rota declined, preferring to remain part of the Commonwealth. In Costa Rica, officials of the GCWP "allegedly offered each family" on the Talamanca reservation, $250 per month for the right to appoint a king. A ceremony was held on the Talamanca reservation to appoint a local Indian as king of the community. Perceiving the GCWP's actions as efforts to establish an independent state the Security Minister ordered the GCWP representative to leave the country.

== Currency ==
Raam currency

Raam is a bearer bond and local currency issued by the Global Country of World Peace. It was designed for the development of agricultural projects and to combat poverty in third world countries. As of 2003, it had limited acceptance in some European and U.S. cities. The currency has been used in Iowa and has been also given approval in The Netherlands where more than 100 Dutch shops, department store chains, in 30 villages and cities, are using the notes at a fixed rate of 10 euros per raam.

The Raam is issued in denominations of 1, 5 and 10 Raam, with one Raam equal to 10 Euros in Europe, and one Raam equal to 10 dollars in the U.S. Raam notes are printed by Joh. Enschedé. In 2002, Maharishi Vedic City Mayor Bob Wynne estimated that there was $40,000 worth of Raam in circulation. The Raam differs from other complementary currencies because its focus is on the export of products rather than improving local circulation to benefit the lives of local people. According to the Minister of Finance for the Global Country of World Peace, the Raam "could be used" for agricultural projects in developing nations. CATO Institute currency expert James Dorn expressed doubt about the viability of the plan, suggesting that other economic approaches would be a better way to establish a network of collective farms. According to the issuer, the Raam is also a bearer bond that earns a total of 3% interest after five years (0.6% simple interest annually).

The Raam was used, as of 2003, alongside Euros in accordance with Dutch law in more than 100 shops in the Netherlands. The Raam was convertible in the Netherlands at the Fortis Bank in Roermond. As of 2003, the Dutch Central Bank estimated that there were approximately 100,000 Raam notes in circulation. It also had limited acceptance in the Iowan cities called Maharishi Vedic City and Fairfield. According to Maharishi Global Financing, agreements were made in 2004 with a farmers' association in South America and with traditional leaders in Africa to start using the Raam for agricultural development projects.

== Administrative centers ==
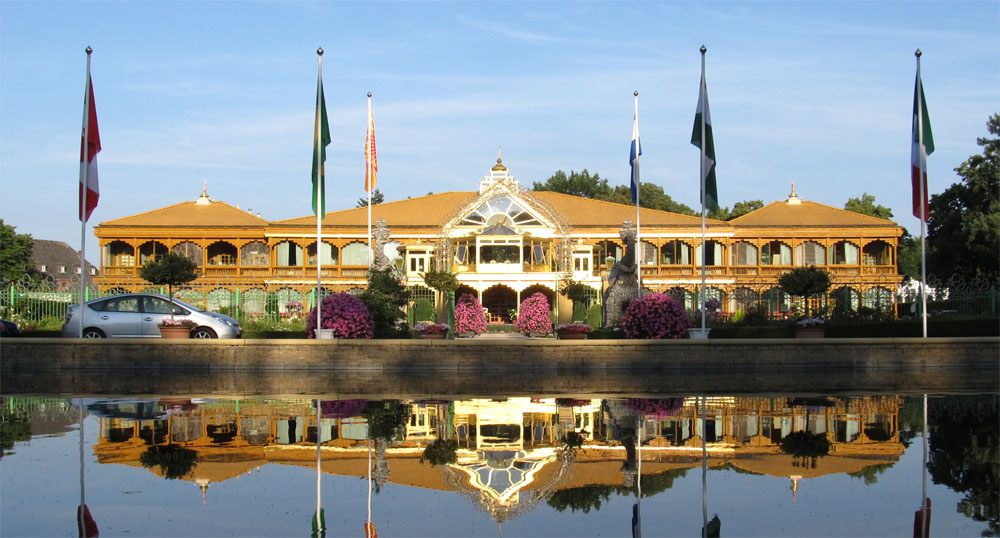
Headquarters in Maharishi European Research University (MERU), Vlodrop.

Maharishi Vedic City is the "Capital of the Global Country for World Peace."

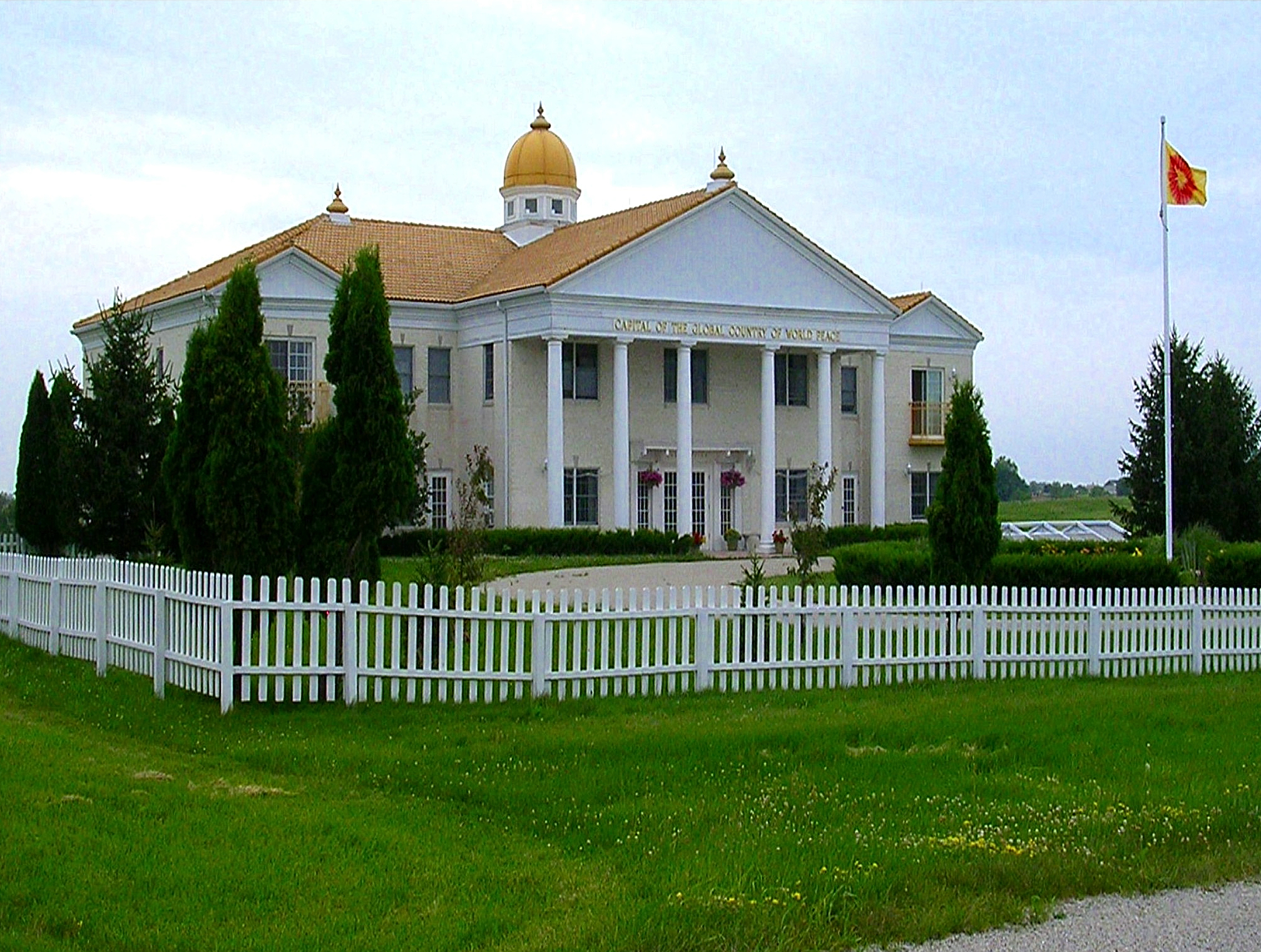
Headquarters in Maharishi Vedic City, USA

The city's plan and building code follow principles of Vedic architecture. Architecture professor Keller Easterling says that Maharishi Vedic City reflects the GCWP's interest in achieving a "benign form of global sovereignty".

From 2004 to 2010 the GCWP owned the American Bank Note Company Building in New York City, USA which it called The Financial Capital of the GCWP. It was intended to be an administrative center for a project to raise funds for 3,000 peace palaces, and hospitals, organic farms, and clinics in developing countries, but over time, its primary use was as a Transcendental Meditation center. When the building became a financial burden it was sold in 2010 and the organization's $5.5 million profit were earmarked for a new Manhattan teaching center and other programs.

The "US Peace Government" has announced plans to build a national capital near Smith Center, Kansas in Washington Township, Smith County. A ceremony was held 28 March 2006. Over 1,000 acres (4.0 km^{2}) were eventually purchased. Plans called for the construction of 12 to 15 buildings, including Peace Palaces and a broadcast center, at an estimated cost of up to $15 million. The plans divided the community. Nine pastors wrote to the local newspaper with concerns about the souls of area residents while the Chamber of Commerce looked forward to the creation of new jobs. The county planning commission placed a moratorium on any changes in land use in an effort to prevent the use of agricultural land for the capital, but they withdrew it after the movement threatened to sue in federal court. In April 2009, a spokesman announced that two Peace Palaces were nearing completion.

In 2009 the GCWP opened the West Virginia Retreat Center in Three Churches, West Virginia, USA. The male-only facility is used for weekend retreats as well as residences for those who want to spend years living a simpler life involving meditation. As of 2012, the center consisted of 10 buildings with 90 male residents plus various staff. Larger plans include the development of the 175 acres (0.71 km^{2}), purchased at a cost of $750,000 into an "environmentally friendly retreat" that will include 150 to 200 rooms for professional and amateur meditators, according to the project director, Raja Bob LoPinto.

== Peace Palaces ==
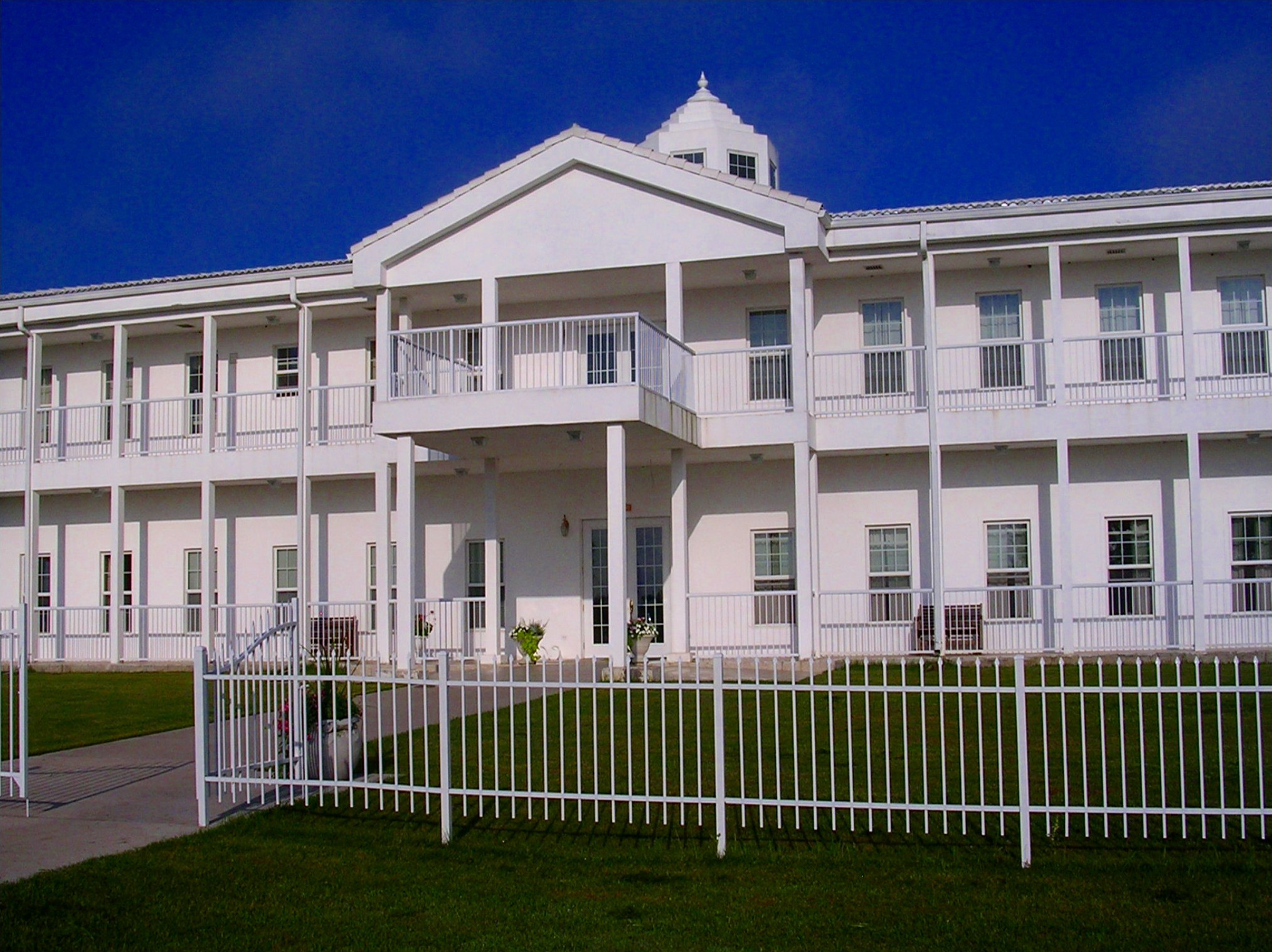
Peace Palace in Fairfield, IA

In 2008, the Global Country of World Peace undertook the construction of "Peace Palaces" in major US cities, which would teach courses in the Transcendental Meditation technique and offer ayurvedic spa treatments and herbal food supplements. The buildings, being built according to Vedic guidelines, were planned to be two-story, white, buildings of about 10,000 to 12,000 square feet (1,100 m^{2}) and are intended to be replacements for rented spaces being used in "more than 200 locations" across the U.S.A. Their appearance has been described as an "Indian temple crossed with a Southern plantation mansion" and is intended to be a "visual brand" for the organization.

Peace Palaces have been completed in the U.S. cities of Bethesda, Maryland, Houston and Austin, Texas, Fairfield, Iowa, St. Paul, Minnesota and Lexington, Kentucky. Three of the existing Peace Palaces were built by private individuals. Land has been purchased in 52 locations around the US and others are being built around the world.

According to officials of the organization, zoning and related issues have slowed their progress in building in at least 18 other cities where land has been purchased. In 2007 the "Maharishi’s organization" took legal action against the city of Mayfield Heights, Ohio, because the city refused a setback variance for a proposed Peace Palace. Although "admired for its finances" some critics call the project a way for the "Maharishi's followers" to create funds for more land for the group's treasury.

== Other facilities ==
In 2005, the Global Country bought an 800-plus acres farm in Goshen, New York, USA for $4 million in cash, with plans to create an organic farm training site, as well as a Peace Palace. According to broker Steve Perfit, the 818 acres (3.31 km^{2}) were put up for sale in April 2009.

Also in 2005, Global Country of World Peace purchased the 27-acre (110,000 m^{2}) Prairie Peace Park in Pleasant Dale, Nebraska. GCWP had planned to build a 12,000-square-foot (1,100 m^{2}) "peace palace" on the site. An article in August 2010 in the Journal Star reported that the property was for sale for $95,000.

In 2006, the Global Country purchased Inishraher, a 30-acre (120,000 m^{2}) island in Clew Bay off the coast of Ireland with the intention of founding an International Peace Centre, and of designating it as a Maharishi Capital of the Global Country of World Peace. Planning permission for two 18-room hostels on the island was approved on 22 July 2009.
