= Pulse diagnosis =

Pseudo-medicine technique

Pulse diagnosis (PD) is an diagnostic technique used in various forms of alternative medicine. It classifies pulse signals from different health conditions. It is a diagnostic technique used in traditional Chinese medicine, Ayurveda, traditional Mongolian medicine, Siddha medicine, traditional Tibetan medicine, and Unani.

== Traditional Chinese medicine ==
Pulse diagnosis is one of the most representative special diagnostic methods in traditional Chinese medicine (TCM) and has been emphasized by various generations of medical practitioners in the long history of development. It remains widely used in clinical practice in China today and continues to serve as an important method of diagnosis in TCM. The practice is based on non-scientific beliefs and bears no relation to actual physiological mechanisms.

The main sites for pulse assessment are the radial arteries in the left and right wrists, where the artery passes adjacent to the styloid process of the radius. In traditional Chinese medicine, the pulse is assessed along a region known as the cun kou, extending proximally from the wrist crease for approximately 1.9 cun, which corresponds to about 3 – 5 cm, based on the proportional system in which the forearm length between the wrist and elbow creases is defined as 12 cun. In traditional Chinese medicine, the pulse is divided into three positions on each wrist. The first pulse closest to the wrist is the cun (inch, 寸) position, the second guan (gate, 關), and the third pulse position furthest away from the wrist is the chi (foot, 尺).

The second approach focuses on individual pulse positions, looking at changes in the pulse quality and strength within the position focused on the cause and not the symptoms, with each position having an association with a particular body area. For example, each of the paired pulse positions can represent the upper, middle and lower cavities of the torso, or are associated individually with specific organs. (For example, the small intestine is said to be reflected in the pulse at the left superficial position, and the heart at the deep position.)

Various classic texts cite different arrangements to the pairings of organs, some omitting the second organ from the pulse entirely while others show organ systems reflecting the acupuncture channels (Wuxing, five phase pulse associations), and another the physical organ arrangement used in Chinese herbal medicine diagnosis (Li Shi Zhen). Generally, the commonly used organ associations are: first position on the left hand represents the heart in the deep position and small intestine is in the superficial position, the second, deep is the liver and superficial is the gallbladder, and third the kidney yin is deep and the bladder superficial. On the right hand, the first deep position is representative of the lungs and superficially the large intestine, the second of the spleen and stomach, and the third represents the kidney yang at a deep level and uterus or the pericardium and the san jiao in the deep position. The strengths and weaknesses of the positions are assessed at 3 depths each, namely fu (floating or superficial, 浮), zhong (middle, 中) and chen (deep, 沉). These 9 positions are used to assess the patient diagnostically, along with the different qualities and speed of the pulse.

Classical texts and modern interpretations describe 29 distinct pulse types, each with specific characteristics and clinical implications.

== Computational pulse diagnosis (CPD) ==
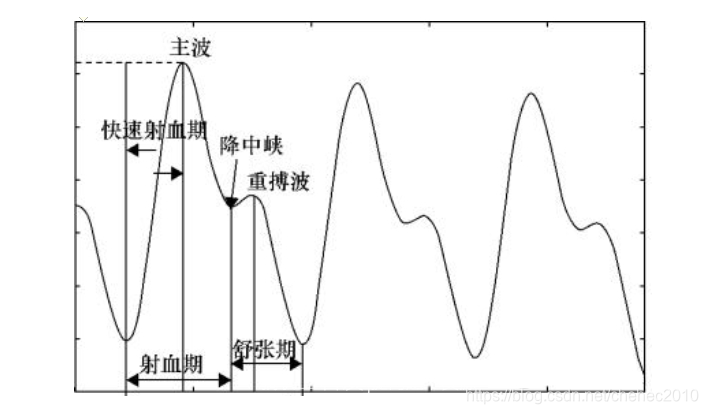
A typical waveform of pulse

Computational pulse diagnosis (CPD) is a technique that applies modern sensing and computational methods to the traditional practice of pulse diagnosis. Conventional pulse diagnosis (PD), widely used in Chinese and other traditional medical systems, relies on tactile assessment of the radial artery to evaluate pulse shape, rhythm, and strength. CPD seeks to replicate this process by employing sensors to capture wrist pulse signals and algorithms to process and analyze them.

== Traditional Indian medicine (Ayurveda and Siddha-Veda) ==
Ayurvedic pulse measurement is done by placing index, middle and ring finger on the wrist. The index finger is placed below the wrist bone on the thumb side of the hand (radial styloid). This index finger represents the Vata dosha. The middle finger and ring finger are placed next to the index finger and represents consequently the Pitta and Kapha doshas of the patient. Pulse can be measured in the superficial, middle, and deep levels thus obtaining more information regarding energy imbalance of the patient.

In Ayurveda, advocates claim that by taking a pulse examination, imbalances in the three Doshas (Vata, Pitta, and Kapha) can be diagnosed. The ayurvedic pulse also claims to determine the balance of prana, tejas, and ojas.

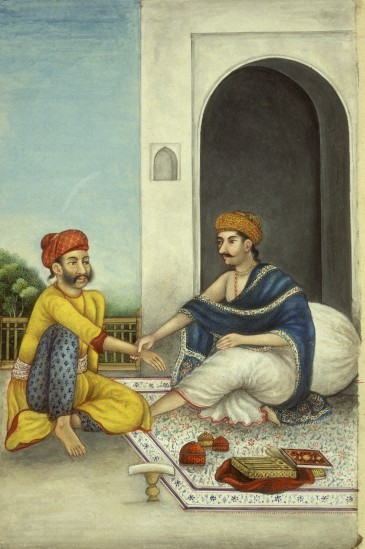
Indian Physician taking pulse

== In ancient Islamic medicine ==
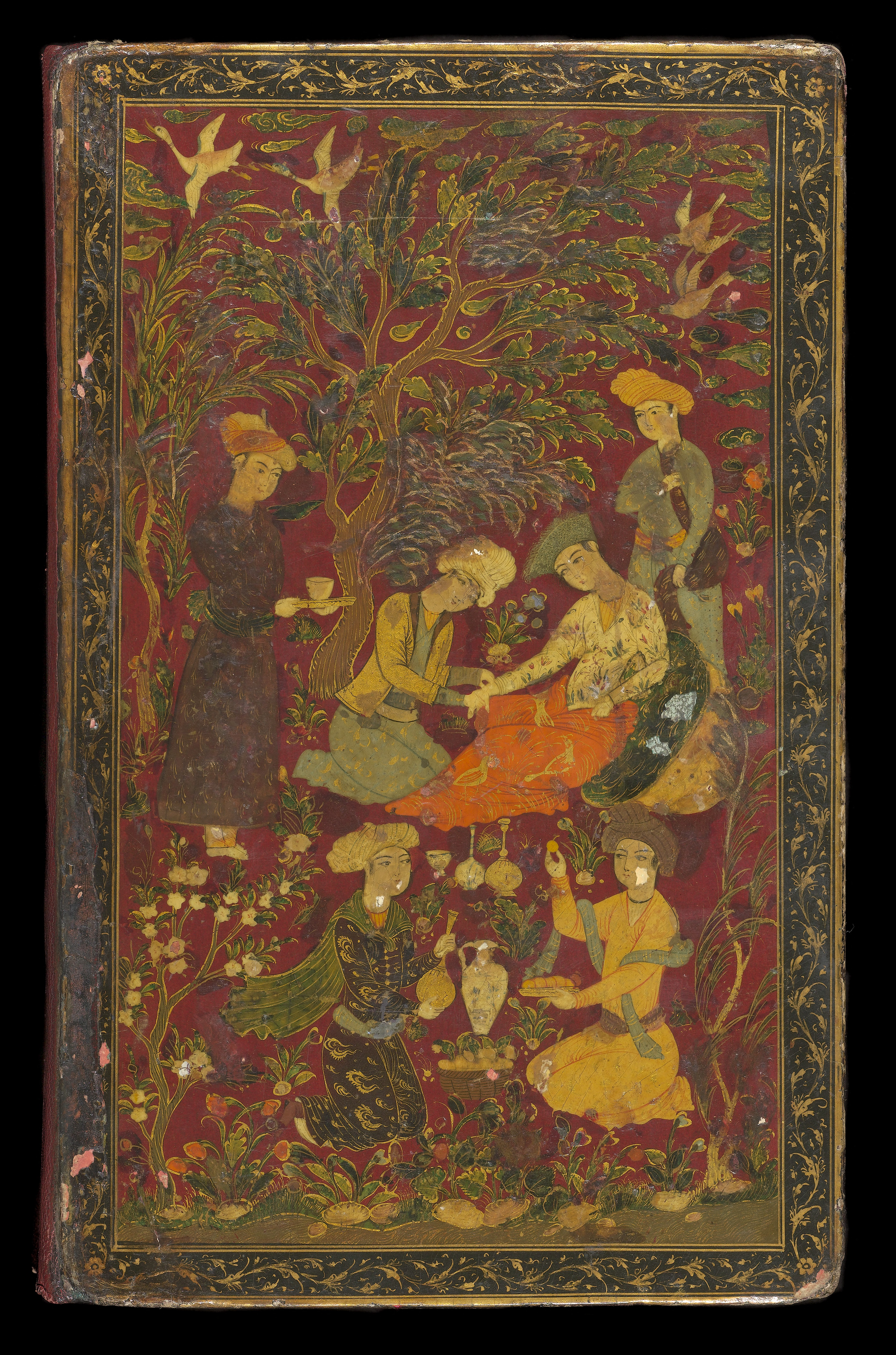
Doctor taking woman's pulse. Avicenna's Canon manuscript

Pulse diagnosis, or pulsology, was part of medicine in the medieval Islamic world. The Canon of Medicine, published in 1025, included instructions on how to analyze the pulse and from such examination, physicians considered that they could identify problems ranging from jaundice to dropsy, diphtheria, pregnancy, and anxiety.
