= Hardgainer (magazine) =

Former weight training magazine

Hardgainer magazine was a weight training magazine for hardgainers (people who find it difficult to add muscle mass).

== History ==
Hardgainer was available only through subscription, and was initially published on a bi-monthly basis starting with the July–August, 1989 issue. Stuart McRobert, a transplanted Englishman living in Nicosia, Cyprus, was the publisher and editor, operating under the name of CS Publishing. At the beginning of 2004, it was announced that the frequency was being scaled back to quarterly. However, only two quarterly issues were published; the April–June, 2004 issue was the final one, bringing the total production to 89 issues. Although the magazine is no longer being published, McRobert has continued to operate the Hardgainer web site and book publishing operation.

Hardgainer built its reputation as a source of no-nonsense training advice. In contrast to most popular bodybuilding magazines, which typically promote training methods of the top competitors, McRobert chose to focus on training methods that were suitable for the typical trainee rather than the genetically gifted and without the use of drugs. A wide variety of writers contributed articles over the years, but the common theme was always abbreviated training, with a concentration on basic, multi-joint exercises such as the squat, deadlift and bench press.

In Brother Iron, Sister Steel: A Bodybuilder's Book, Dave Draper summarizes the Hardgainer approach as follows:

Hardgainer, made popular by Stuart McRobert, is another offshoot of abbreviated training that encourages the utilization of basic, multi-joint movements to near muscular fatigue without compromising form, endangering the body or miscalculating recovery time.

In the book Dinosaur Training, Brooks Kubik included Hardgainer in a list of four publications (along with Milo, The Iron Master, and H.I.T. Newsletter) to which he recommended that his readers should subscribe, referring to them as "excellent sources of information about productive weight training".

McRobert has published several books on weight training under the Hardgainer / CS Publishing umbrella, including Brawn (1991), The Insider's Tell-All Handbook On Weight-Training Technique (1996), Beyond Brawn (1998), and Further Brawn (2001).
