= Your Health Now =

American health magazine

Your Health Now

Your Health Now was a free, bi-monthly health magazine provided by Merck & Co., Inc. The magazine was launched in September 2005 and was available by mail, online, and in doctors’ offices. The magazine was headquartered in Whitehouse Station, New Jersey.

Every issue included articles on various health topics, updates on patient assistance programs, an “Ask the Doctors” section in which reader questions are answered by medical experts, and information on caring for your pet. The magazine was based on information from The Merck Manuals and reviewed by an independent board of medical professionals and patient advocacy organizations.

In 2006 the magazine started a Spanish version.
