= Maharishi Vedic City, Iowa =

City in Iowa, United States

- City
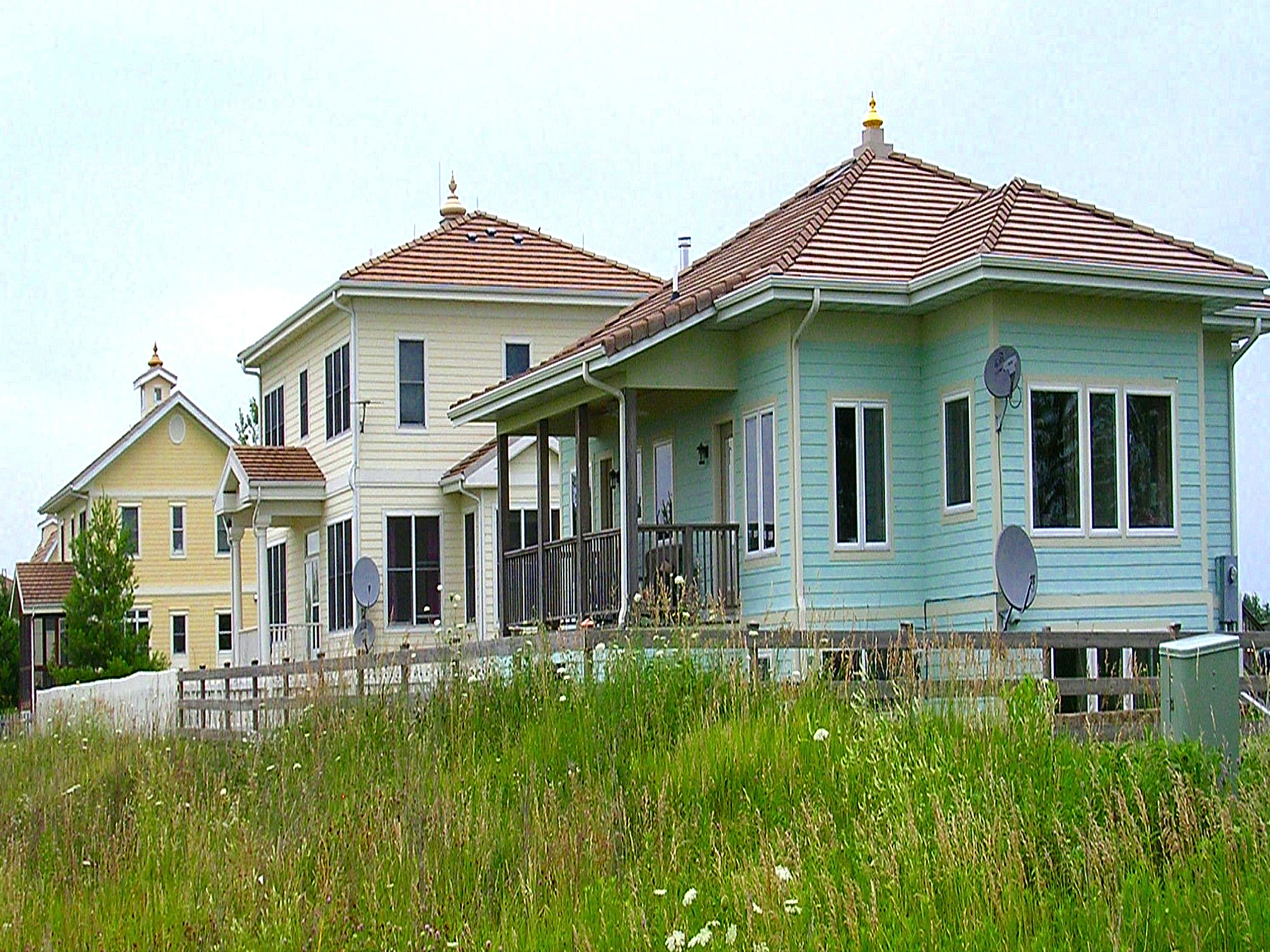
- Homes in Maharishi Vedic City in 2010

- Flag Wordmark
- Interactive map of Maharishi Vedic City, Iowa
- Coordinates: 41°03′16″N 92°00′53″W
- Country: United States
- State: Iowa
- County: Jefferson
- Established: November 13, 2001

Government
  - Mayor: James Rogers Badgett

Area
  - Total: 3.34 sq mi (8.65 km^{2})
  - Land: 3.34 sq mi (8.65 km^{2})
  - Water: 0 sq mi (0.00 km^{2})
- Elevation: 791 ft (241 m)

Population (2020)
  - Total: 277
  - Density: 82.9/sq mi (32.02/km^{2})
- Time zone: UTC-6 (Central (CST))
  - Summer (DST): UTC-5 (CDT)
- ZIP codes: 52556
- Area code: 641
- FIPS code: 19-48500
- GNIS feature ID: 2395815
- Website: maharishivediccity-iowa.gov

Maharishi Vedic City (MVC) is a city in Jefferson County, Iowa, United States. The population was 277 at the time of the 2020 census. The city was incorporated in 2001 as "Vedic City" but then officially changed its name to "Maharishi Vedic City" five months later. It was the first city to incorporate in Iowa since 1982. Maharishi Vedic City consists of approximately three square miles, located about four miles north of Fairfield, the home of Maharishi University of Management.

The city plan and buildings are based on Maharishi Sthapatya Veda, which is said to be an ancient system of architecture and design, revived by Maharishi Mahesh Yogi. Its goals are to "protect, nourish, and satisfy everyone, upholding the different social, cultural, and religious traditions while maintaining the integrity and progress of the city as a whole".

== History ==
The concept of a "Vedic City" was conceived by the Maharishi, and a real estate developer and several others began to actualize the vision for a Vedic town in 1991. The first resolution of the city council proclaimed the constitution of the city to be the same as "the Constitution of the Universe — Total Natural Law — RK Veda".

More than a dozen developers purchased 50 farms totaling 3,000 acres (12 km^{2}), some 1,200 of which were designated for the town itself. Together, they planned a city arranged in ten circles totaling about one square mile, along with paved roads, utilities, sewage and Internet. They then began the first phase of construction, which included two hotels, various houses and office buildings. After one year, 46 structures had been built and more than $35 million spent on development. Financial and infrastructure needs led the developers to seek formal designation as a city from the state, and after petitioning the Iowa City Development Board and holding a referendum, it was incorporated as Iowa's newest city on July 25, 2001 — the first in Iowa since 1982. Planners expected the city to have a population of over 1,000 by 2010, many of them transplants from nearby Fairfield. In the early stages of development, Vedic City set aside 50 acres as land for conservation and preservation. This acreage was then transformed from farmers' fields to native prairies, wetlands and forest.

In 2002, a building known as "The Mansion" became a headquarters for the Global Country of World Peace (GCWP). The Mayor of MVC is Rogers Badgett.

According to city officials in 2004, "more than $200 million of venture capital had been invested in Fairfield and Vedic City companies during the past 13 years". By 2006, the city consisted of more than 200 buildings.

In October 2011, a television show titled "America's Most Unusual Town" aired on the Oprah Winfrey Network on March 25, 2012, and featured Winfrey's visit to Fairfield and Maharishi Vedic City.

== Organic economy ==
In November 2002, the city council passed an ordinance banning the sale of non-organic food within its borders.

In 2003, the city began offering tours to the public and has several thousand visitors per year. The city has an organic farm and sells produce to retail outlets such as the Whole Foods Market. Maharishi Vedic City, and the nearby town of Fairfield, "receive federal grants from agencies including the Departments of Energy and Agriculture for developing renewable energy sources" and recycling programs.

The city council voted to ban the use of synthetic pesticides and fertilizers within the city limits in April 2005, becoming the first all-organic city in the country.

== Geography ==
According to the United States Census Bureau, the city has a total area of 3.36 square miles (8.70 km^{2}), all land.

== Demographics ==
Historical populations
Year	Pop.	±%
2010	259	—
2020	277	+6.9%
Source:"U.S. Census website". United States Census Bureau. and Iowa Data Center; Source: U.S. Decennial Census

=== 2020 census ===
As of the census of 2020, there were 277 people, 159 households, and 73 families residing in the city. The population density was 82.9 inhabitants per square mile (32.0/km^{2}). There were 178 housing units at an average density of 53.3 per square mile (20.6/km^{2}). The racial makeup of the city was 84.5% White, 5.4% Black or African American, 0.0% Native American, 5.1% Asian, 0.4% Pacific Islander, 1.4% from other races and 3.2% from two or more races. Hispanic or Latino people of any race comprised 2.2% of the population.

Of the 159 households, 10.1% of which had children under the age of 18 living with them, 32.1% were married couples living together, 4.4% were cohabitating couples, 39.6% had a female householder with no spouse or partner present and 23.9% had a male householder with no spouse or partner present. 54.1% of all households were non-families. 49.1% of all households were made up of individuals, 28.3% had someone living alone who was 65 years old or older.

The median age in the city was 67.9 years. 6.5% of the residents were under the age of 20; 2.9% were between the ages of 20 and 24; 10.1% were from 25 and 44; 16.2% were from 45 and 64; and 64.3% were 65 years of age or older. The gender makeup of the city was 47.3% male and 52.7% female.

=== 2010 census ===
The Census Bureau has since done a recount for the 2010 census.

As of the census of 2010, there were 259 people, 142 households, and 48 families residing in the city. The population density was 77.1 inhabitants per square mile (29.8/km^{2}). There were 174 housing units at an average density of 51.8 per square mile (20.0/km^{2}). The racial makeup of the city was 95.0% White, 2.3% African American, 1.5% Asian, and 1.2% from two or more races. Hispanic or Latino people of any race were 1.9% of the population.

There were 142 households, out of which 2.8% had children under the age of 18 living with them, 30.3% were married couples living together, 2.1% had a female householder with no husband present, 1.4% had a male householder with no wife present, and 66.2% were non-families. 47.9% of all households were made up of individuals, and 7.7% had someone living alone who was 65 years of age or older. The average household size was 1.74 and the average family size was 2.33.

The median age in the city was 57.8 years. 2.3% of residents were under the age of 18; 5.4% were between the ages of 18 and 24; 12.3% were from 25 to 44; 69.1% were from 45 to 64; and 10.8% were 65 years of age or older. The gender makeup of the city was 49.8% male and 50.2% female.

== Features ==
Maharishi Vedic City utilizes a system of building called Maharishi Sthapatya Veda design architecture. This ancient Indian system of architecture and city planning is said to promote happiness, peace and prosperity for its occupants. In Maharishi Sthapatya Veda, all structures are built according to precise Vedic proportions, with rooms placed according to the movement of the sun and entrances that face due east. In addition, each building includes an interior, silent core called a "brahmasthan", a perimeter boundary called a "vastu fence" and a gold-colored roof fixture called a "kalash".

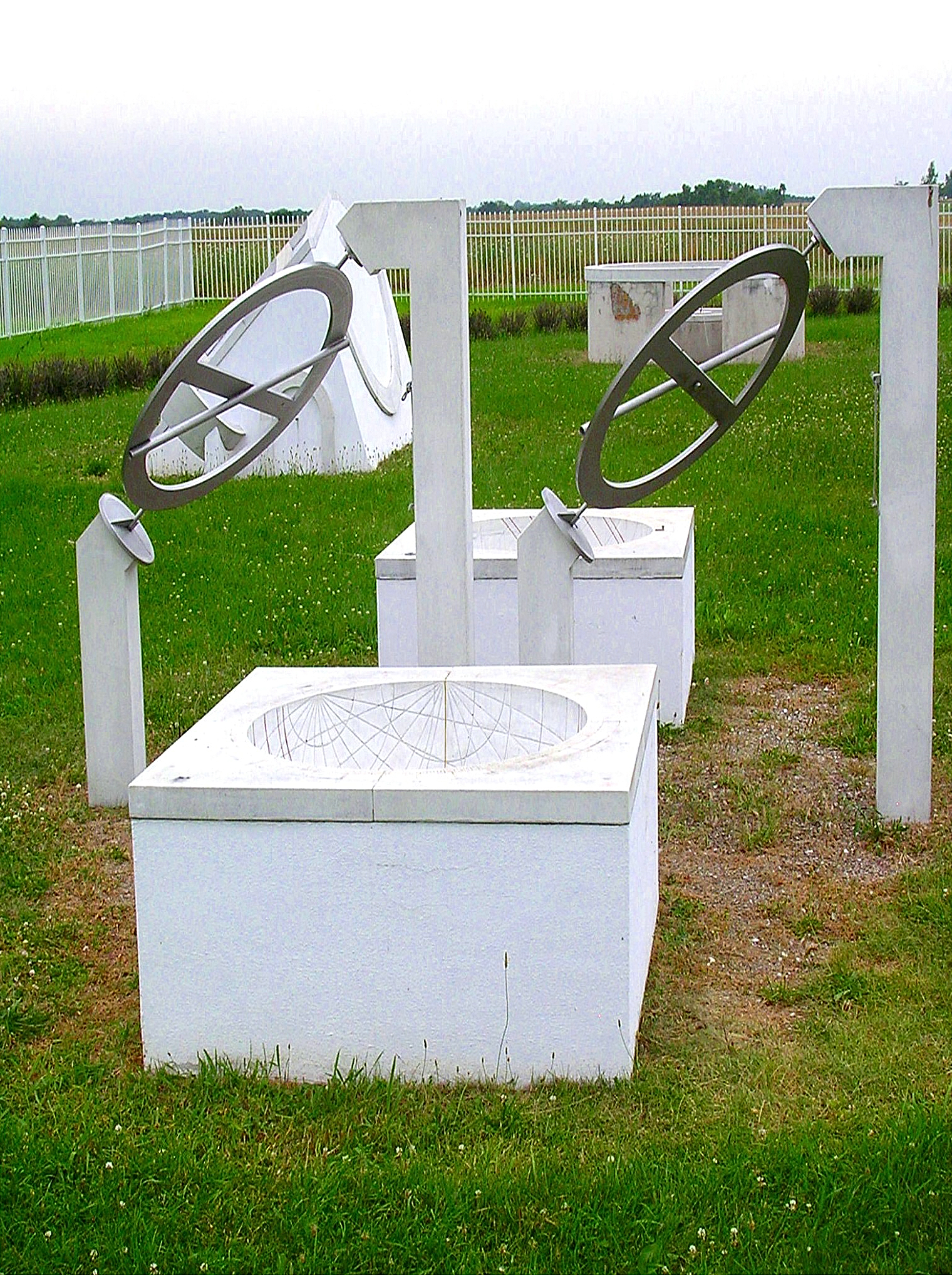
Instruments at the Vedic Observatory

One of the unique features of the city is an outdoor Vedic Observatory consisting of ten six-feet-tall, white, concrete-and-marble astronomical instruments arranged in a circle. According to the observatory developer, Tim Fitz-Randolph, each instrument is precisely aligned with the sun, moon and stars, and could be used to calculate their actual movements and has the potential to create inner happiness and balance in the physiology.

The city also owns and operates a 160-acre (0.65 km^{2}) organic farm which includes a 1.2-acre (4,900 m^{2}) greenhouse. A wind turbine provides electricity for the greenhouses and was paid for in part by a USDA renewable energy grant. The farm distributes its "50 varieties of fruits and vegetables" locally as well as to restaurants in Iowa City, Des Moines and Chicago. The city has plans to expand the greenhouses to 70 acres (280,000 m^{2}). The city does not have any streetlights or utility poles and its master plan includes only electric cars within the city limits. The city council has voted to provide its residents with "off-grid power" from wind and solar generated power.

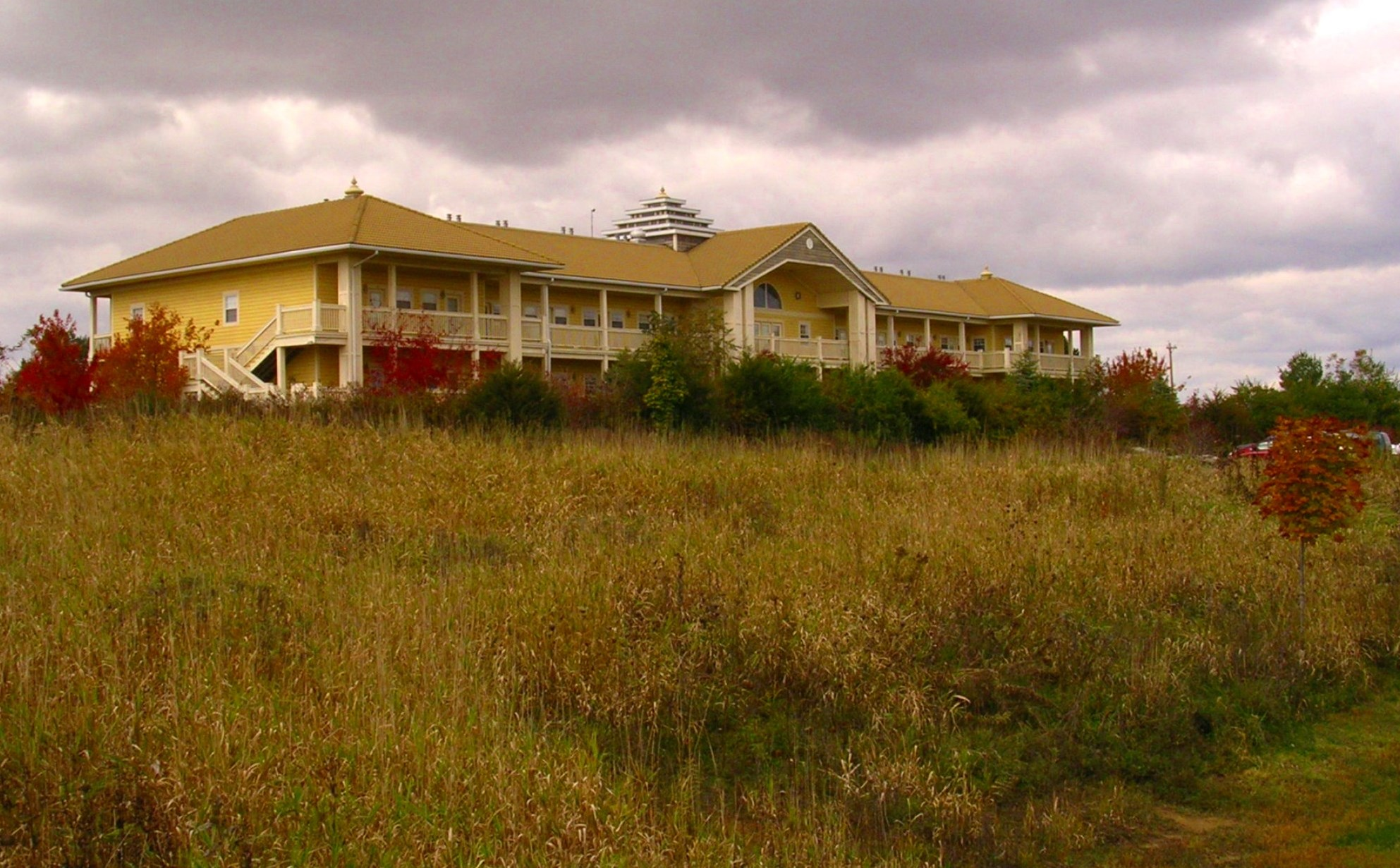
Rukmapura Park Hotel, Maharishi Vedic City

A Maharishi Ayur-Veda Spa Center and Hotel called "The Raj" is located in MVC on a 100-acre (0.40 km^{2}) estate with gardens, lakes and nature trails. It offers a variety of treatments in accordance with the Maharishi Vedic Approach to Health. The city also features the Rukmapura Park Hotel, a "25-room wood structure in the tradition of European country inns".

The 2001 master plan includes two domes in the center of the city to serve as a venue for group practice of the Transcendental Meditation technique and the TM-Sidhi program, including Yogic Flying. Residents subscribe to the theory and research that group practice of this technique "will create coherence for the whole country". In 2006, a Los Angeles Times reporter wrote that the city "displays all the architectural characteristics of a new exurban development: gaudy, over sized construction that has no stylistic relation to its environment." A 2010 article reported that city officials were working with Tom Doak on the construction of a public golf course.

== Government ==
The city has a commitment to balance, natural law, and the principles of the Vedas, which are the ancient sacred scriptures of Hinduism written in Sanskrit. Maharishi Vedic City is administered by a five-person city council.
