= 1996 Natural Law National Convention =

United States political event

- 1996 presidential election
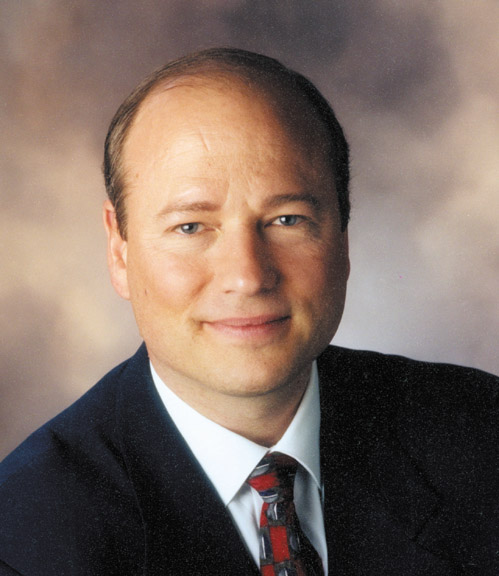
- Presidential nominee (Hagelin)

Convention
- Date(s): August 21–24, 1996
- City: Washington, D.C.
- Venue: Mayflower Hotel

Candidates
- Presidential nominee: John Hagelin of Iowa
- Vice-presidential nominee: Mike Tompkins of Massachusetts

Voting
- Total delegates: ~250

The 1996 Natural Law National Convention was held August 21–24, 1996, in Washington, D.C. It functioned both a presidential nominating convention as well as the annual conference of the Natural Law Party, a third party which advocated Transcendental Meditation. At the convention, party founder John Hagelin was formally nominated for president in the 1996 United States presidential election, with Mike Tompkins nominated as his vice presidential running mate.

== Logistics ==
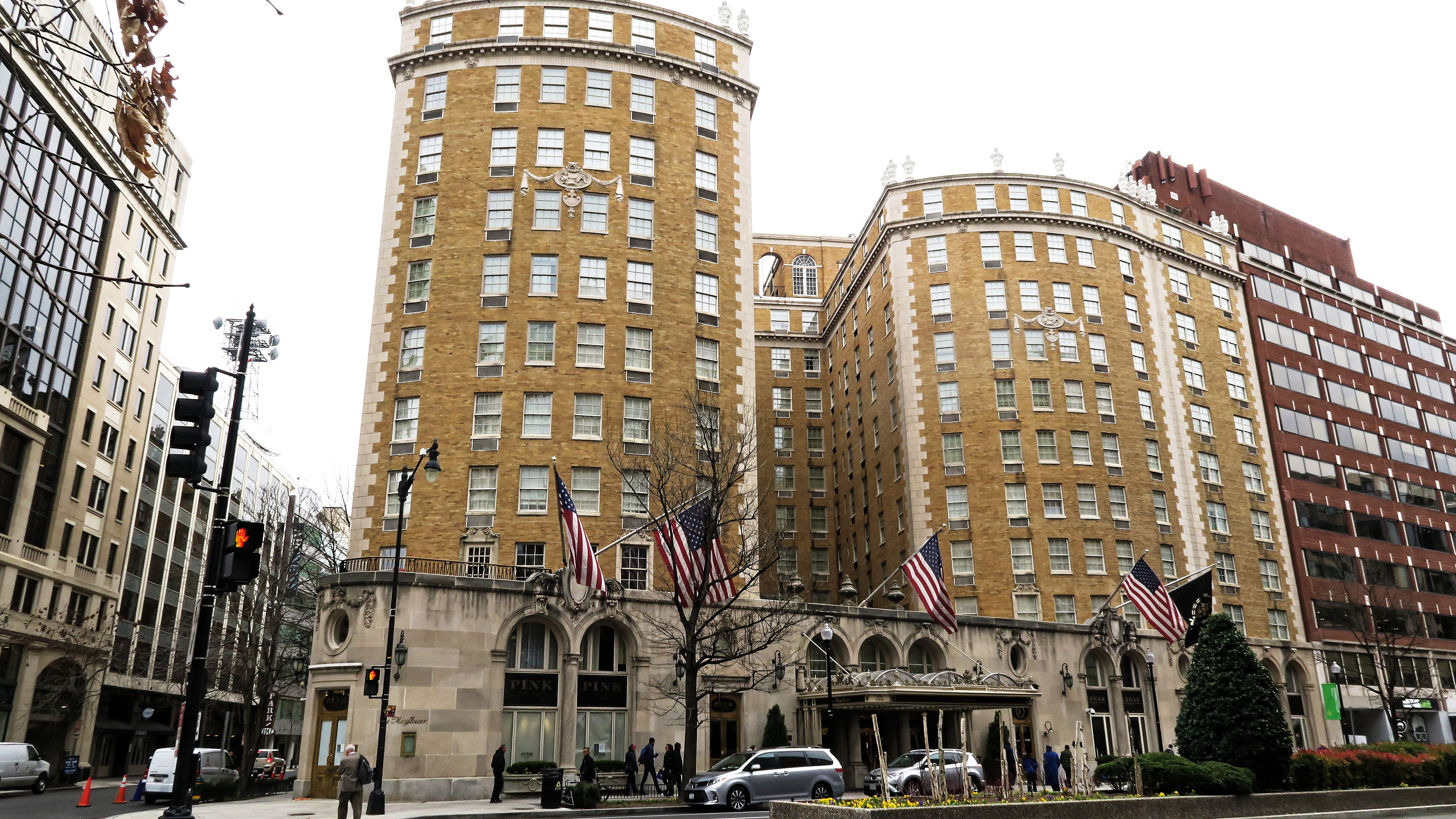
Mayflower Hotel, which was the venue of the convention

The convention was held August 21–24 at the Mayflower Hotel in Washington, D.C. The convention marked the party's second presidential nominating convention, with the party having only been started in 1992. In addition to being a presidential convention, the convention also served as an iteration of the Natural Law Party's annual conference. In the 1996 United States elections, the party was poised to run as many as 700 or 1,000 candidates for various offices. It ultimately ran more than 400, who cumulatively received more than 2 million votes in the 1996 United States elections.

The convention occurred in the week between the conclusion of the 1996 Reform National Convention and the start of the 1996 Democratic National Convention.

The convention was described as a "modest affair that drew a few hundred to a downtown ballroom." It featured approximately 250 delegates. In addition to party business, it also featured seminars on subjects such as healthcare.

== Nominations ==
The included the formal nomination of the party's 1996 presidential ticket, voted on during the convention's second day. As was anticipated, the convention nominated the same ticket that the party had run four years earlier, with physics professor and party founder John Hagelin as its presidential nominee and scientist Mike Tompkins as its vice presidential nominee. This ticket was broadly anticipated, and had been treated as the party's presumptive nominees in advance of the convention. Both nominees were employees of the public policy think tank at the Maharishi University of Management.

== Platform ==
A party platform was adopted at the convention.

The party's main distinguishing position was its advocacy of Transcendental Meditation, which received numerous mentions in the party's 1996 platform.
