= 1992 Natural Law National Convention =

United States political event

- 1992 presidential election
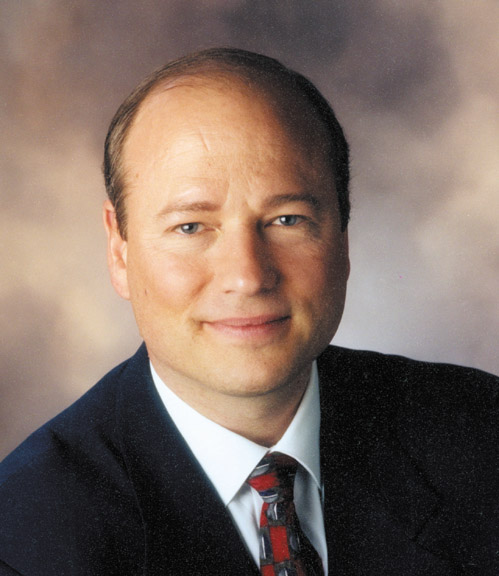
- Presidential nominee (Hagelin)

Convention
- Dates: October 5, 1992
- City: Washington, D.C.
- Venue: Grand Hyatt Washington

Candidates
- Presidential nominee: John Hagelin of Iowa
- Vice-presidential nominee: Mike Tompkins of Massachusetts

Voting
- Total delegates: 400 or 800

The 1992 Natural Law National Convention was held on October 5, 1992, in Washington, D.C. At the convention, Natural Law Party founder John Hagelin was formally nominated for president in the 1992 United States presidential election, with Mike Tompkins nominated as his vice presidential running mate.

== Logistics ==
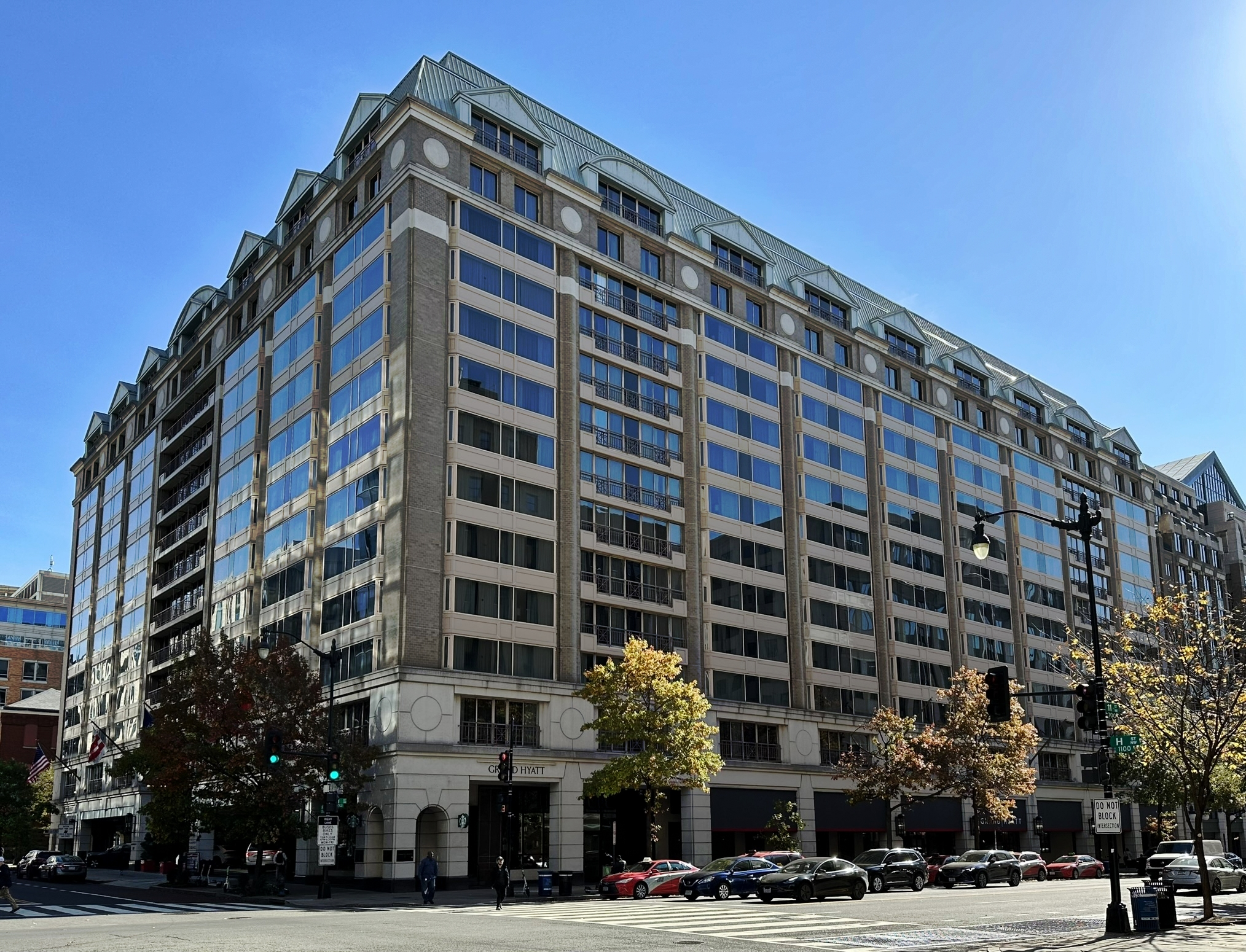
Grand Hyatt Washington, which was the venue of the convention

The convention was held at the Grand Hyatt Washington in Washington, D.C., on October 5, 1992. It featured as many as 400 or 800 delegates. Some of the delegates participated via telephone, calling-in their votes (with their voice being broadcast to the convention hall via speaker as they did so).

The convention was the inaugural presidential nominating convention of the United States Natural Law Party, which had been founded approximately six months prior. By the time of the convention, the party had 80 nominees running for either U.S. House of Representatives or U.S. Senate in 1992, and had ballot access in 30 states plus Washington D.C. for the presidential election.

== Nominations ==
The convention formally nominated party founder John Hagelin for president, with Mike Tompkins as his vice presidential running mate. Prior to the convention, the two had already been campaigning as the party's presumptive nominees
