= Electoral history of Jack Kemp =

List of elections featuring Jack Kemp as a candidate

== Congressional elections ==
Dist.	Year	Republican	Votes	Pct.	Conservative	Votes	Pct.	Right to Life	Votes	Pct.	Democrat	Votes	Pct.	Liberal	Votes	Pct.	Fair Trade	Votes	Pct.
39	1970	Jack Kemp	82,939	44.1%	Jack Kemp	14,050	7.5%				Thomas P. Flaherty	86,142	45.8%	Thomas P. Flaherty	4,807	2.6%			
38	1972	Jack Kemp	139,681	65.1%	Jack Kemp	17,286	8.1%				Anthony P. LoRusso	54,236	25.3%	Anthony P. LoRusso	3,349	1.6%			
38	1974	Jack Kemp	111,417	63.4%	Jack Kemp	15,270	8.7%				Barbara C. Wicks	46,596	26.5%	Barbara C. Wicks	2,333	1.3%			
38	1976	Jack Kemp	151,610	71.5%	Jack Kemp	14,092	6.6%				Peter J. Geraci	44,034	20.8%	Peter J. Geraci	2,273	1.1%			
38	1978	Jack Kemp	100,032	83.3%	Jack Kemp	13,896	11.6%							James A. Peck	6,204	5.2%			
38	1980	Jack Kemp	141,763	69.0%	Jack Kemp	16,108	7.8%	Jack Kemp	9,563	4.7%	Gale A. Denn	35,681	17.4%	Gale A. Denn	2,194	1.1%			
31	1982	Jack Kemp	121,266	68.4%	Jack Kemp	12,196	6.9%				James A. Martin	42,204	23.8%	James A. Martin	1,639	0.9%			
31	1984	Jack Kemp	152,810	68.1%	Jack Kemp	15,522	6.9%				Peter J. Martinelli	53,513	23.8%	Peter J. Martinelli	2,643	1.2%			
31	1986	Jack Kemp	80,904	50.3%	Jack Kemp	7,068	4.4%	Jack Kemp	4,536	2.8%	James P. Keane	66,956	41.6%	Gerald R. Morgan	913	0.6%	James P. Keane	618	0.4%

== Presidential elections ==
1988 Republican presidential primaries:

- George H. W. Bush - 8,258,512 (67.91%)
- Bob Dole - 2,333,375 (19.19%)
- Pat Robertson - 1,097,446 (9.02%)
- Jack Kemp - 331,333 (2.72%)
- Unpledged - 56,990 (0.47%)
- Pierre S. du Pont, IV - 49,783 (0.41%)
- Alexander M. Haig - 26,619 (0.22%)
- Harold Stassen - 2,682 (0.02%)

1996 United States presidential election

- Bill Clinton/Al Gore (D) (inc.) - 47,401,898 (49.2%) and 379 electoral votes (31 states and D.C. carried)
- Bob Dole/Jack Kemp (R) - 39,198,482 (40.7%) and 159 electoral votes (19 states carried)
- Ross Perot/Pat Choate (Reform) - 7,680,908 (8.0%)
- Ralph Nader/Winona LaDuke (Green) - 654,731 (0.7%)
- Harry Browne/Jo Jorgensen (Libertarian) - 485,134 (0.5%)
- Howard Phillips/Herbert Titus (Taxpayers) - 182,723 (0.2%)
- John Hagelin/Michael Tompkins (Natural Law) - 111,528 (0.1%)
- Others - 674,414 (0.7%)
