= Alfred Jenkins (disambiguation) =

Alfred Jenkins (born 1952) is an American football wide receiver.

Alfred Jenkins may also refer to:

- Alfred Jenkins (quarterback) (born 1964), American football player
- Alfred Jenkins (sports promoter) (1901–1976), New Zealand sports promoter
- Alfred L. Jenkins (1916–2000), American diplomat and expert on Chinese-American relations
