= Natural Law Party (United States) =

American political party

- Abbreviation: NLP
- Chairperson: Doug Dern
- Founded: April 22, 1992; 34 years ago
- Dissolved: April 30, 2004 (as national party)
- Headquarters: Hartland, Michigan
- Ideology: Transcendental Meditation; Civil libertarianism Environmentalism
- Colors
- Michigan House of Representatives: 0 / 110
- Michigan Senate: 0 / 38
- Statewide Executive Offices: 0 / 4
- U.S. House of Representatives: 0 / 14
- U.S. Senate: 0 / 2

Website
- natural-law.org nlpmi.org

The Natural Law Party (NLP) is a political party in Michigan. It was a national political party in the United States, founded in 1992, affiliated with the international Natural Law Party. Beginning in 2004, many of its state chapters dissolved. The party's Michigan chapter is still active as of 2026.

The party proposed that political problems could be solved through alignment with the unified field of all the laws of nature through the use of the Transcendental Meditation and TM-Sidhi programs. Leading members of the party were associated with Maharishi Mahesh Yogi, leader of the Transcendental Meditation movement.

The national version of the Natural Law Party ran John Hagelin as its presidential candidate in 1992, 1996 and 2000. The party also ran congressional and local candidates. It attempted to merge with the Reform Party in 2000. Several state affiliates have kept their ballot positions and have allied with other small parties.

== Political stance ==
"Natural Law" referred to "the ultimate source of order and harmony displayed throughout creation." Harmony with Natural Law could be accomplished by the practice of Transcendental Meditation and more advanced techniques.

The NLP proposed that a government subsidized group of 7,000 advanced meditators known as Yogic Flyers would lower nationwide stress, reduce unemployment, raise the gross national product, improve health, reduce crime, and make the country invincible to foreign attack. Hagelin called it a "practical, field-tested, scientifically proven" solution. TM would be taught to the military, to students, in prisons, and to ordinary citizens.

Hagelin predicted that implementation of the program would result in $1 trillion in savings from reduced costs for medical care, criminal prosecutions and prisons, national defense, and other government expenses. It recommended adoption of the Grace Commission reforms. The party supported a flat tax.

Election-related proposals included replacing the Electoral College with popular vote, automatic voter registration, public funding of campaigns, reducing the campaign season, and the elimination of political action committees.

Civil rights planks included equal rights for women and homosexuals, replacing bans on abortion with prevention programs, and a national referendum on capital punishment. It opposed the legalization of drugs. In 1992, it suggested the appointment of former Secretary of State George Shultz as drug czar.

It endorsed organic, sustainable agriculture, renewable energy, and conservation.

Slogans included: "Only a new seed will yield a new crop", and "bring the light of science into politics". Catchphrases included: "prevention-oriented solutions" and "conflict-free politics".

As of 2018 the Natural Law Party of Michigan has adopted a policy of acceptance with the chairman of the party stating "My belief is right wing, left wing, same bird. We still try to educate people on the concepts of the Natural Law Party, of scientific solutions to government. But by the same token if you've got different ideas we won't keep you out."

== Founding ==
Bevan Morris, president of Maharishi University of Management (then called "Maharishi International University"), was the founding chairman of the party, which he created on 22 April 1992 in Fairfield, Iowa.

The party said it had no direct connection to Maharishi Mahesh Yogi or to TM. Hagelin said, "It's not a transcendental meditation party", and denied any connection between the Maharishi University of Management and his campaign. Mike Tompkins, also a member of the MUM staff, said that more than half of its founders were connected to the TM movement. One critic said that it was "just another front group for the TM movement". By one report, almost all of the 92 candidates who ran on the NLP slate in California in 1996 were TM practitioners.

The Natural Law Party had to qualify separately in each state to nominate a presidential candidate. It used 300 signature gatherers, both paid and volunteer, in California alone. The party submitted 5,724 signatures in Iowa, as the party announced at a press conference attended by Mike Love, a member of The Beach Boys and a TM supporter. Nevada required 9,392 signatures. The NLP joined another small party in suing the state over their early deadline, and they succeeded in getting a court to order a second chance to qualify. The NLP qualified after submitting 11,000 valid signatures. The party submitted the required 250,000 signatures in California too late to qualify for the ballot there. By the time of the election, Hagelin was on the ballot in 31 states plus the District of Columbia.

It was certified as a national party by the Federal Election Commission in September 1992, making it eligible for federal campaign funds.

== Elections/campaigns ==
=== 1992 ===
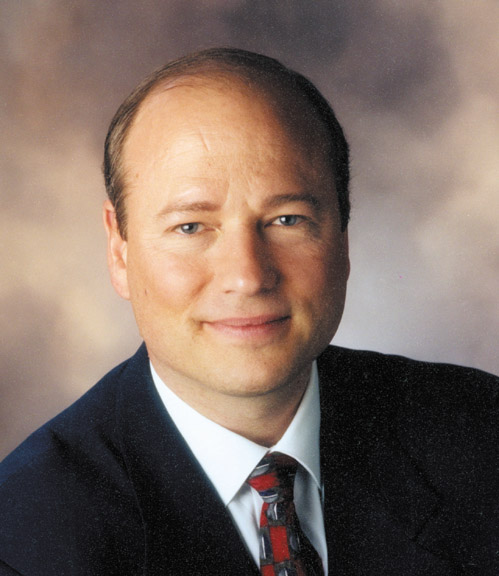
John Hagelin, three-time NLP candidate for U.S. President

After being founded in April 1992, the party quickly qualified to appear on ballots in 32 states.

John Hagelin, at the time a 37-year-old physics professor at Maharishi University of Management (MUM), was the NLP candidate for president of the United States in 1992. He said that he had been uninterested in politics and a Republican "by default" before the campaign. Hagelin and running mate Mike Tompkins were formally chosen at the party's 400-person convention in Washington, D.C., on 5 October 1992, although they had already begun campaigning. Both of them took six-month leaves of absence from the university to campaign.

Hagelin proposed that all candidates should have their brain waves recorded by EEG and the resulting "mental profiles" should be publicly disclosed, so that the voters could see which candidates had the best "brain-wave stability". He said that the test would "allow us to avoid the possibility of a brain-dead candidate". The proposal was dropped because of a poor reception.

Hagelin was excluded from the presidential debates and he asked the Federal Election Commission to take over the process. He did participate in the Alternative Candidates' National Debate along with the candidates or representatives of three other parties. Hagelin's campaign cost several million dollars.

The NLP had nine candidates for U.S. Congress in California. The sole congressional candidate in Massachusetts was a movement employee. Two people tried to get on the ballot for congress in Missouri, but only one succeeded in getting enough petition signatures. The party said it had 100 candidates running in state and local offices. The NLP ran a candidate in Illinois for Senate. There were reported to be between 80 and 175 candidates on the NLP slate.

The Beach Boys raised funds for the NLP during a summer concert tour. Mike Love said he was switching his support from George H. W. Bush to Hagelin.

In addition to its own slate, the NLP also endorsed candidates in other races, including Republicans and New Alliance Party members among others. The party touted having candidates in 125 elections in 1992.

=== 1994 ===
The NLP ran slates of candidates in the 1994 mid-term election. Four candidates ran in Nevada. It hired professional petition gatherers to support 12 candidates for the ballot in Missouri. The party touted having 100 candidates running for various offices in twenty states during the 1994 election.

=== 1995 ===
The party started collecting petitions in 1995 for the 1996 election. It submitted 110,000 signatures in California with 35,000 coming from the county of San Diego. It spent up to $250,000 on signature gatherers, in addition to its volunteer efforts. Party officials said that 70% of the signatures came from students and the party qualified for the ballot in 1995. It submitted 55,000 signatures to qualify in Ohio, half of which were collected by volunteers. It made a serious effort to get on the ballot in all 50 states.

Hagelin came in third in a non-binding straw poll held in Fayette, Missouri, after visiting there twice. He received 20% of the 352 votes cast, ahead of Bob Dole and Ross Perot. The party published a 172-page platform booklet, the longest of any party.

Hagelin said that the party had been treated as a political curiosity in 1992, but had become a political force by 1995. The party was the subject of jokes on late-night TV shows, and its leaders admitted that some voters rejected the party because of the Maharishi's teachings.

=== 1996–1998 ===
In 1996, the NLP called itself the "fastest-growing grassroots party with 700 candidates on the ballot in 48 states". It ran 92 candidates for local, state, and federal offices in California alone. There were about 50 on the ballot in Ohio.

By January 1996, the party had collected $400,000 in donations, while Hagelin's campaign had received about $300,000 plus $100,000 in matching funds.

Hagelin threatened to sue the organizers of the National Issues Convention, a forum on social issues held in January 1996, if he was not allowed to participate along with the Republican and Democratic candidates. He continued to have trouble attracting attention from the media. At the Utah press conference announcing that the NLP had qualified for the ballot, only a single reporter attended. NLP candidates, including Hagelin, said they did not expect to win but were using the campaigns to spread their message.

During the 1996 election, the party ran hundreds of candidates for seats in the United States House of Representatives, against both Democratic and Republican incumbents. The successful candidates were mostly in California, where many of them received about 3% of the vote, and Ohio, where some candidates received 4% or 5% of the vote. The candidate running against Democrat James Traficant, a conservative Democrat with no Republican opposition that year, received 9%. In South Carolina, the party received 10% of the vote against Republican Floyd Spence who had no other opposition.

In California, psychiatrist Harold H. Bloomfield ran as candidate for governor in 1998.

=== 2000 ===
In 2000, Hagelin created an independent coalition between the Natural Law and the Reform Party. The coalition failed when Patrick Buchanan took control of the Reform Party.

On March 31, 2000, the Federal Election Commission certified primary season matching funds for John Hagelin, who was seeking the nomination of the Natural Law and Reform Parties. Hagelin was the second minor party presidential candidate to qualify; the first was Pat Buchanan. Ralph Nader eventually qualified as well. According to the Federal Election Commission, the NLP spent $2.3 million on its presidential campaign in the 1999–2000 election cycle.

Following Hagelin's and the Natural Law Party's failed attempt at a coalition with the Reform Party in 2000, the Natural Law Party ran its own ticket of Hagelin and Nat Goldhaber. The pair appeared on 38 ballots and received 83,702 votes or 0.1% of the total. This poor finish led Maharishi Mahesh Yogi to stop endorsing the Party and very few members renewed their membership in 2001.

Between 2000 and 2004, the Natural Law Party sought to create an independent coalition of voters interested in election law reform. In 2002, the party endorsed Independence Party of Minnesota candidate for Minnesota Governor, Tim Penny.

| Office | Candidate | State | Votes | % | Misc. |
|---|---|---|---|---|---|
| United States Senate | William Quarton | Michigan | 5,630 | 0.1% | |
| United States House of Representatives | Wendy Conway | Michigan | 1,839 | 0.6% | District 1 |
| United States House of Representatives | Susan J. Goldberg | Michigan | 2,705 | 0.9% | District 2 |
| United States House of Representatives | Jerry Berta | Michigan | 866 | 0.3% | District 3 |
| United States House of Representatives | Stuart J. Goldberg | Michigan | 792 | 0.3% | District 4 |
| United States House of Representatives | Brian D. Ellison | Michigan | 1,345 | 0.5% | District 5 |
| United States House of Representatives | Gail Anne Petrosoff | Michigan | 1,159 | 0.4% | District 7 |
| United States House of Representatives | Allen, Patricia Rayfield | Michigan | 715 | 0.2% | District 8 |
| United States House of Representatives | Alaya Bouche' | Michigan | 824 | 0.3% | District 9 |
| United States House of Representatives | Bonnie Hixson | Michigan | 1,228 | 0.4% | District 11 |
| United States House of Representatives | Fred D. Rosenberg | Michigan | 887 | 0.3% | District 12 |
| United States House of Representatives | Arndt, David | Michigan | 1,304 | 0.5% | District 13 |
| United States House of Representatives | Miller, Richard R. | Michigan | 1,030 | 0.5% | District 14 |
| United States House of Representatives | N. Fouad Hamze | Michigan | 938 | 0.4% | District 16 |
| Michigan House of Representatives | Gordon Reh | Michigan | 2 | 0.0% | District 31 |
| Member of the State Board of Education | Lynnea Ellison | Michigan | 28,315 | 0.3% | |
| Member of the State Board of Education | Gail Quarton | Michigan | 25,418 | 0.3% | |
| Regent of the University of Michigan | Lisa Anne Puccio | Michigan | 47,447 | 0.6% | |

=== 2002 ===
| Office | Candidate | State | Votes | % | Misc. |
|---|---|---|---|---|---|
| United States Senate | Doug Dern | Michigan | 10,366 | 0.3% | |
| Member of the State Board of Education | Michael A. Kitchen | Michigan | 30,804 | 0.5% | |
| Regent of the University of Michigan | David, Arndt | Michigan | 41,788 | 0.7% | |
| Governor of Wayne State University | Kathleen Oakford | Michigan | 54,370 | 1.0% | |

=== 2003 ===
In 2003, 2 candidates ran in the California governor recall election under the Natural Law Party. They were Iris Adam and Darin Price, who received 1,297 and 1,152 votes respectively, both of which are less than 0.1% of the total votes for the replacement governor.

=== 2004 ===
By 2003, the Natural Law Party had so weakened that it endorsed Dennis Kucinich, a Democrat, for president, rather than trying to achieve ballot status for a candidate of its own, having lost all but 10 ballot lines. Hagelin went on to create an organization called the US Peace Government.

According to the Natural Law Party official web site, the national headquarters of the Natural Law Party closed effective on April 30, 2004, and the US Peace Government is now carrying forward the programs, policies, and ideals of the Natural Law Party.

Entities using the name are still active in some states. The South Carolina branch of the party was taken over by the South Carolina Green Party. However, several candidates were on the ballot in 2004 under the Natural Law Party banner, including Socialist Party Presidential Candidate Walt Brown. In 2006 the Idaho Natural Law Party merged with the new United Party, with the United Party taking over the ballot line via a name change. Only the Michigan and Mississippi Natural Law parties remained as ballot-qualified parties.

| Office | Candidate | State | Votes | % | Misc. |
|---|---|---|---|---|---|
| United States House of Representatives | Anthony America | Michigan | 2,153 | 0.6% | District 10 |
| Member of the State Board of Education | Colette McLogan | Michigan | 57,659 | 0.7% | |
| Regent of the University of Michigan | Mary F. Debusschere | Michigan | 77,637 | 0.9% | |
| Trustee of Michigan State University | Katherine Dern | Michigan | 87,022 | 1.0% | |
| Governor of Wayne State University | Kathleen Oakford | Michigan | 78,048 | 0.9% | |

=== 2006 ===
The party lost its ballot status in California. The Idaho Natural Law Party remained active, and was prepared to have three candidates on the ballot for state and federal office in 2006 by entering into a coalition with the new United Party, and thus remained the only Natural Law Party still active in the United States of America. However, on June 16 the Idaho Natural Law Party changed its name to the United Party.

| Office | Candidate | State | Votes | % | Misc. |
|---|---|---|---|---|---|
| Member of the State Board of Education | Debra Hayden | Michigan | 66,552 | 1.0% | |
| Regent of the University of Michigan | Valerie G. Hilden | Michigan | 51,946 | 0.8% | |
| Trustee of Michigan State University | Katherine Dern | Michigan | 68,958 | 1.0% | |
| Governor of Wayne State University | Tara C. Stegner | Michigan | 54,406 | 0.8% | |

=== 2008 ===
On July 30, 2008, the Michigan Natural Law Party nominated Ralph Nader for president, ensuring the appearance of the Nader/Gonzalez campaign on the Michigan ballot. Nader received 33,085 votes in Michigan, helping the Natural Law Party maintain ballot status in Michigan.

The Mississippi Natural Law Party nominated the Socialist Party presidential ticket of Brian Moore and Stewart Alexander, though they were ultimately barred from appearing on the Mississippi ballot because of a legal controversy surrounding the deadline hour for filing their presidential electors.

| Office | Candidate | State | Votes | % | Misc. |
|---|---|---|---|---|---|
| United States Senate | Doug Dern | Michigan | 18,550 | 0.3% | |

=== 2010 ===
| Office | Candidate | State | Votes | % | Misc. |
|---|---|---|---|---|---|
| United States House of Representatives | Alan Jacquemotte | Michigan | 409 | 0.2% | District 12 |
| Member of the State Board of Education | Stacy Kohmescher | Michigan | 32,145 | 0.5% | |
| Governor of Wayne State University | Doug Dern | Michigan | 25,807 | 0.4% | |

=== 2012 ===
The Natural Law Party was still active in Michigan, led by attorney Doug Dern. According to Dern, who ran twice as a Natural Law candidate for U.S. Senate and once for the Hartland Township Board of Trustees, the party appeared on the 2012 presidential ballot ticket. In August 2012, the party nominated former Salt Lake City Mayor Rocky Anderson for president.

| Office | Candidate | State | Votes | % | Misc. |
|---|---|---|---|---|---|
| United States Senate | John D. Litle | Michigan | 11,229 | 0.2% | |
| United States House of Representatives | Daniel Johnson | Michigan | 3,251 | 0.9% | District 11 |
| Regent of the University of Michigan | Nikki Mattson | Michigan | 79,501 | 1% | |

=== 2014 ===
| Office | Candidate | State | Votes | % | Misc. |
|---|---|---|---|---|---|
| Governor | Patrick Groulx | Michigan | 17 | 0.0% | Write-In |
| Secretary of State | Jason Robert Gatties | Michigan | 13,185 | 0.4% | |
| United States House of Representatives | Jeremy Burgess | Michigan | 1,680 | 0.7% | District 8 |
| State Board of Education | Nikki Mattson | Michigan | 30,099 | 0.5% | |
| Trustee of Michigan State University | Bridgette Guzman | Michigan | 35,097 | 0.6% | |
| Governor of Wayne State University | Yolanda Robson | Michigan | 29,053 | 0.5% | |

=== 2016 ===
On July 28, the Michigan chapter of the Natural Law Party, which maintained ballot access despite the defunct national party, nominated Mimi Soltysik of California and Angela Nicole Walker of Wisconsin and gave the ticket its first presidential ballot line in 2016. Soltysik and Walker were also the nominees of the Socialist Party USA.

Michigan also ran two Congressional candidates: Keith Butkovich and Jeremy Burgess.

| Office | Candidate | State | Votes | % | Misc. |
|---|---|---|---|---|---|
| United States House of Representatives | Keith Butkovich | Michigan | 1,838 | 0.6% | District 4 |
| United States House of Representatives | Jeremy Burgess | Michigan | 2,250 | 0.6% | District 8 |
| Regent of the University of Michigan | Bridgette Abraham-Guzman | Michigan | 84,194 | 1.0% | |
| Governor of Wayne State University | Wendy Goossen | Michigan | 62,223 | 0.7% | |
| Michigan Supreme Court | Doug Dern | Michigan | 336,160 | 9.7% | |

=== 2018 ===
On August 1, the Michigan chapter of the Natural Law Party nominated Keith Butkovich for Governor, Raymond Warner for Lt. Governor, and John Wilhelm for US Senate. Butkovich is the first gubernatorial candidate in the state party's history.

| Office | Candidate | State | Votes | % | Misc. |
|---|---|---|---|---|---|
| United States Senate | John Howard Wilhelm | Michigan | 16,502 | 0.4% | |
| Governor of Michigan | Keith Butkovich | Michigan | 10,202 | 0.2% | |
| Lieutenant Governor of Michigan | Raymond Warner | Michigan | 10,202 | 0.2% | |
| University of Michigan Board of Regents | Marge Katchmark Sallows | Michigan | 51,710 | 0.7% | |

=== 2020 ===
| Office | Candidate | State | Votes | % | Misc. |
|---|---|---|---|---|---|
| United States Senate | Doug Dern | Michigan | 13,093 | 0.2% | |
| University of Michigan Board of Regents | Keith Butkovich | Michigan | 37,193 | 0.4% | |
| Michigan State University Board of Trustees | Bridgette Abraham-Guzman | Michigan | 46,193 | 0.5% | |
| Michigan House of Representatives | Andrew Warner | Michigan | 638 | 1.4% | |

=== 2022 ===
| Office | Candidate | State | Votes | % | Misc. |
|---|---|---|---|---|---|
| Governor | Daryl Simpson | Michigan | 4,973 | 0.11% | |
| Lt. Governor | Doug Dern | Michigan | 4,973 | 0.11% | |
| Trustee of Michigan State University | Sarah Brewer | Michigan | Nil | N/A | |
| University of Michigan Board of Regents | Kathleen Oakford | Michigan | 45,564 | 0.57% | |
| Wayne State Board of Governors | Keith Butkovich | Michigan | Nil | N/A | |

=== 2024 ===
On April 18, 2024, it was announced by his presidential campaign that Robert F. Kennedy Jr. would appear on the ballot in Michigan as the nominee of the Natural Law Party in the 2024 United States presidential election. This was confirmed by a spokesperson for the Michigan Secretary of State's office. Later, in August 2024, Kennedy announced that he was suspending his campaign and endorsing Donald Trump while formally staying in the race but removing his name from the ballots of swing states, such as Michigan. Kennedy's attempts to have his name removed from the Michigan ballot were refused by the Natural Law Party, noting that Michigan law requires candidates once nominated to remain on the ballot unless they die during the campaign.

== Presidential tickets ==
| Election | Presidential; Candidate | Vice Presidential; Candidate | Popular votes | Percent |
| 1992 | John Hagelin | Mike Tompkins | 37,137 | nil |
| 1996 | John Hagelin | Mike Tompkins | 113,670 | 0.1% |
| 2000 | John Hagelin | Nat Goldhaber | 83,702 | 0.1% |
| 2008 | Ralph Nader | Matt Gonzalez | 33,085 | 0.6% (Mich.) |
| 2012 | Ross C. Anderson | Luis J. Rodriguez | 5,147 | 0.1% (Mich.) |
| 2016 | Emidio Soltysik | Angela Nicole Walker | 2,209 | <0.1% (Mich.) |
| 2020 | Roque De La Fuente | Darcy Richardson | 2,986 | 0.1% (Mich.) |
| 2024 | Robert F. Kennedy Jr. | Nicole Shanahan | 26,844 | 0.48% (Mich.) |
