= Maharishi University of Management stabbing =

- Location: Fairfield, Iowa
- Date: March 1, 2004
- Target: Students at Maharishi International University
- Attack type: Stabbing
- Weapons: Pen, paring knife
- Deaths: 1
- Injuries: 1
- Perpetrator: Shuvender Sem

The Maharishi University of Management stabbing occurred on March 1, 2004, when without provocation, a university student Shuvender Sem fatally stabbed a fellow student, Levi Butler, after Sem had attacked another student earlier in the day. The event occurred at Maharishi University of Management (later renamed to Maharishi International University), Fairfield, Iowa, United States, and attracted attention partly due to the university's practice of "yogic flying," which proponents say reduces violence in the surrounding area. Sem was found not guilty due to insanity. A lawsuit against the university that had charged negligence was settled out of court.

== Incident ==
On March 1, 2004, Shuvender Sem, who had been enrolled at the university for less than two months, stabbed another student in the face with a pen during a class called Teaching for Enlightenment. Told by university staff that he did not require medical attention, the injured student drove himself to the hospital where he received seven stitches. University officials consulted a psychologist and decided that Sem would have to leave the university, but didn't report the incident to police. Sem didn't appear dangerous or agitated and was taken by Joel Wysong, the school's dean of men, to his on-campus apartment until he could take a flight home the next morning. Left unattended, Sem took a paring knife from Wysong's kitchen and went to the university's dining hall. Wysong followed Sem to the dining hall and watched while Sem interacted with other students, but did not take him back into custody. After about ten minutes and without provocation, Sem stabbed another student, freshman Levi Butler, four times in the chest, killing him.

Sem, who was "a diagnosed schizophrenic", reportedly "had been off his medication for months" at the time of the murder. After initially being declared incompetent, Sem was subsequently deemed competent to stand trial. The judge ruled Sem not guilty by reason of insanity at the urging of both the defense attorneys and prosecutors. In an April 22, 2010, news article in the Des Moines Register, Michael Taylor, the Des Moines-area psychiatrist who testified on Sem's behalf at his trial, says that the insanity defense was appropriate for this case.

== Context ==
The university places an emphasis on reducing crime.

Crime prevention is one of the seven founding goals of the University: "To solve the age-old problem of crime and all behavior that brings unhappiness to the family of man." All students and administrators practice the Transcendental Meditation and TM-Sidhi programs which are designed to help eliminate criminal tendencies and behavior at their root cause.

College crime and campus security are significant issues in the United States, with 2,500 rapes and 3,000 aggravated assaults occurring at U.S. colleges every year. A 2007 USA Today analysis of this incident and more than one hundred other killings that occurred on U.S. college campuses between 1991 and 2007 reported that flawed college security was to blame in at least 15 of these killings. The USA Today report noted that more and more colleges in the U.S. have accepted students with mental disorders, and that many of these students discontinued their medication, causing serious problems. Questioning campus officials' and professors' expertise in handling such students, the report cited University of South Florida criminologist Max Bromley as saying, "The people who might see those behaviors first have the least background in how to deal with it."

On March 29, 2010, a district judge in Jefferson County told Sem he could leave the psychiatric hospital in Independence, Iowa, and return to his home in Pennsylvania. Psychiatrist Michael Taylor recommended that Sem live at home with his parents while he went back to college and stated that Sem's paranoid schizophrenia was "completely controlled" by the drug "Abilify".

== Response ==
According to journalist Antony Barnett, the attacks at the Maharishi University of Management led critics to question claims that advanced meditation techniques could end violence. The university said that this was the first incident of its kind on their campus, which they say is the most crime-free campus in the country, and that it was not their role to bring criminal charges against students. Craig Pearson, executive vice-president, reported that the Maharishi had said of the incident that "this is an aspect of the violence we see throughout society", including the violence that the U.S. perpetrates in other countries.

Barnett also reported that critics alleged, without providing evidence, that other incidents had been "hushed up", and that negative publicity was strenuously avoided. In response to the accusation of a cover-up, Bill Goldstein, the university's legal counsel, was quoted as saying, "In my 22 years as legal counsel the issue of image is never considered with regard to reporting incidents on campus. The university reports incidents to the police every week for their action and has always done so."

The stabbing also raised a question about medical doctors recommending meditation for people with underlying psychological problems, and especially the risks of doing so in the case of those suffering from depression and schizophrenia. A former MUM professor, Kai Druhl, who had left the TM movement, said that he recalled another student with schizophrenia who had been advised to stop taking his medication and to instead use daily meditative work and had had a mental breakdown.

== Lawsuits ==
On February 24, 2006, the injured student and Butler's estate sued the university and the Maharishi Vedic Education Development Corporation (MVED) in federal court. The suits charged gross negligence for ignoring warnings that Sem was dangerous, for failing to report the first attack to police, as required by the university's own policies, for failing to provide medical attention to the injured student, and for failing to control the scene properly, causing delays in the emergency response. The suits further alleged that staff members said the attacks occurred because Sem was not meditating properly, and that the twice-daily practice of Transcendental Meditation, which the university requires of all students, can be dangerous for people with psychiatric problems. The lawsuit against MVED was dismissed by Judge James E. Griztner of the U.S. District Court, and those against the university were settled out of court in 2009. The settlement may have been reached due to a dispute over whether MUM President Bevan Morris would testify before a jury. MUM presented the court with a motion to quash that subpoena.

A separate suit, for wrongful death, was filed in state court by Butler's parents.
