= Nat Goldhaber =

American politician

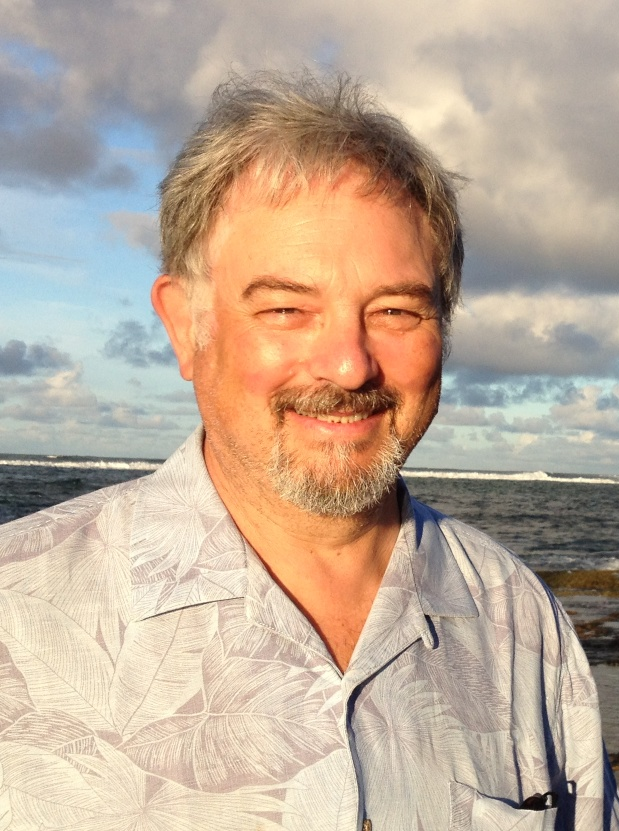
- Goldhaber in 2013
- Citizenship: United States
- Education: UC Berkeley MA in Education
- Scientific career
- Workplaces: Claremont Creek Ventures

Amos Nathaniel "Nat" Goldhaber is an American venture capitalist, computer entrepreneur and politician. Goldhaber conceived of and helped found Maharishi International University where he serves as its vice chairman. He was special assistant to Lieutenant Governor William Scranton III and founder and chief executive of TOPS, a computer networking company. He served as president of the venture capital firm Cole Gilburne Goldhaber & Ariyoshi Management. He was the founding CEO of the Apple–IBM joint venture, Kaleida Labs, and was the founding CEO of CyberGold, an Internet marketing company that became a public stock offering in 1999. He was the 2000 U.S. vice president candidate for the Natural Law Party and serves as the managing director of Claremont Creek Ventures, an investment firm. Goldhaber is an independent member of the Board of Directors at Chewy, Inc. He is an ATP pilot.

== Education ==
Goldhaber received a BA in interdisciplinary studies from Maharishi International University and an MA in education from the University of California, Berkeley. In June 2013 he received an PhD (H. C.) from Maharishi University of Management.

== Career ==
In the 1960s, Goldhaber became interested in meditation and worked directly with Maharishi Mahesh Yogi, the founder of the Transcendental Meditation technique. In 1970 he proposed the establishment of and in 1971 co-founded Maharishi International University, an accredited institution in Fairfield, Iowa, In 1976, he wrote TM: an Alphabetical Guide to the Transcendental Meditation Program with Denise Denniston and Peter McWilliams.

From 1979 to 1982, Goldhaber worked in Pennsylvania politics as special assistant to the lieutenant governor William Scranton III and later as the interim director of the state's energy agency. Goldhaber left government to build a career in high technology and founded his first company, Centram Systems Inc., which developed networking for personal computers. Goldhaber was founder and chief executive of TOPS, a computer networking company which Goldhaber sold to Sun Microsystems in 1987 for $20 million. Goldhaber then served as vice president of Sun Microsystems. Centram Systems product, called TOPS ("Transcendental Operating System"), allowed transparent file sharing among Macs, PCs, and Unix machines, using the AppleTalk protocol.

In 1989, Goldhaber became the president of Cole Gilburne Goldhaber & Ariyoshi Management, a venture capital firm specializing in high technology for computers. In 1992, IBM and Apple Computer Inc. appointed Goldhaber as president and founding CEO of their joint multi-media venture, Kaleida Labs. In 1995, Goldhaber became the founding CEO of Cybergold, an Internet marketing and payment system which went public in 1999 and merged with MyPoints.com, Inc. in August 2000 in a stock-for-stock deal worth approximately $160 million.

Goldhaber was the Natural Law Party nominee for vice president in 2000 on the ticket with presidential candidate John Hagelin. At the convention for a splinter faction of the Reform Party of the United States of America allied with party founder Ross Perot, Goldhaber won the nomination for vice president over candidate Lenora Fulani by a vote of 120–66. The Federal Elections Commission later decided that Buchanan and Fulani were the Reform Party's legitimate nominees.

In 2005, Goldhaber established Oakland-based Claremont Creek Ventures with colleagues, Randy Hawks and John Steuart, specializing in clean energy and healthcare investments in the San Francisco Bay Area and around the globe. Goldhaber currently serves as managing director.

In 2011, AOL.com named Goldhaber resident expert at Claremont Creek Ventures on energy conservation and management systems and one of the "Top Five Clean Energy VCs and Principals" in the US.

In 2012, Goldhaber and Claremont Creek Ventures commissioned a study by graduate students at the University of Michigan Erb Institute for Global Sustainable Enterprise that determined that the United States could reach energy independence through significant penetration of electric and natural gas vehicles into the market, and increased public and private sector investment in renewables, energy efficiency technologies and North American oil reserves. The results of this study were released at the UC Berkeley BERC Energy Symposium.

In 2025, Goldhaber was appointed an independent director of Chewy, Inc.

== Other ==
The National Academies of Science, Engineering, Medicine: Division on Engineering and Physical Sciences appointed Goldhaber to its Board on Energy and Environmental Systems.

Goldhaber is a member of the US Secret Service Electronics Crime Taskforce and an emeritus Member of the Federation of American Scientists.

He was a friend of Electronic Frontier Foundation founder, the late John Perry Barlow.

He served as Special Deputy and was a Commander San Francisco Sheriff's Air Squadron, now a Retired Deputy.

Goldhaber flies his own aircraft, an SF50 G2+ VisionJet, and flies part 135 charter for SkyDance Air. Goldhaber is an ATP Pilot with Jet ratings for CE525S, CE750 and SF50.

== Personal life ==
Goldhaber lives in San Antonio, Texas, with his wife, Marilyn.

Preceded by Michael Tompkins	Natural Law Party vice presidential candidate 2000 (lost)	Succeeded by (none)
