= David Orme-Johnson =

Scholar of transcendental meditation

- Born: January 17, 1941 (age 85); El Paso, Texas, United States
- Education: Columbia University; University of Maryland, College Park
- Known for: Research on Transcendental Meditation
- Scientific career
- Fields: Psychology, Neuroscience
- Workplaces: Maharishi International University; University of Texas at El Paso
- Website: http://www.truthabouttm.org/

David W. Orme-Johnson (born January 17, 1941) is a former professor of psychology at Maharishi International University. He is the author of over 100 papers investigating the effects of the Transcendental Meditation technique.

== Early life and education ==
David Orme-Johnson was born in El Paso, Texas. He received a B.A. from Columbia University in Psychology in 1963, and a Ph.D. in Experimental Psychology in 1969 from the University of Maryland, College Park.

== Professional career ==
From 1969 to 1971, Orme-Johnson served as a lecturer at the University of Texas at El Paso (UTEP). While at UTEP, he conducted the first research on the effects of Transcendental Meditation (TM) on autonomic stability and autonomic recovery from stressors. The paper, published in Psychosomatic Medicine, the journal of the American Psychosomatic Society, reported fewer spontaneous galvanic skin responses (GSR) in meditators, and more rapid habituation of the GSR to loud tones.

Orme-Johnson was director of research and evaluation for the U.S. Army drug rehabilitation program at Fort Bliss from 1971 to 1972.

In 1973, Orme-Johnson joined Maharishi International University (MIU), formerly Maharishi University of Management (MUM), in Fairfield, Iowa. Orme-Johnson served as the Chairman of the Psychology Department and Dean of Research until 1996. As Chairman of the Psychology Department, he “led the MIU Psychology Department in the theoretical development of Maharishi Vedic Psychology”. In addition, he was director of the university's psychology doctoral program and co-director of its neuroscience doctoral program, as well as director of its Institute for World Peace. He also served as director of research at the Institute of Science, Technology, and Public Policy.

According to Orme-Johnson, he was Vice Chancellor of Maharishi European Research University from 1975 to 1977 and Acting President of Maharishi International University from 1976 to 1977.

In 1982, Orme-Johnson was the co-presenter for a report on Transcendental Meditation research given at Congressional hearings by the Subcommittees on International Security and Scientific Affairs to establish an Academy of Peace. Orme-Johnson gave a four-point proposal dedicated to peace in the US and around the world.

Orme-Johnson's paper, "International peace project in the Middle East," was published in the Journal of Conflict Resolution in 1988 and again in 1990 in the Scientific Research on Maharishi's Transcendental Meditation and TM-Sidhi Program: Collected Papers. The second published version included an Appendix A which contained the data used for the study. The paper was criticized in 1997 by University of Iowa professors Evan Fales and Barry Markovsky, who took issue with the Maharishi Effect theory and with Orme-Johnson's interpretation of evidence. They complained that Orme-Johnson refused to share his raw data and concluded that the probability of the Maharishi Effect theory was "very close to zero". Orme-Johnson defended his work in a 2009 paper. After reviewing their critique, he wrote that it was "not supported by either the empirical data nor by a logical analysis of the theory". He also noted that published plots of the raw data were given to Fales and Markovsky and that a simple visual inspection of these plots would have shown that their alternate hypotheses could not explain the study's results. The raw data is available on his website.

He participated in a delegation of teachers from Maharishi International University who traveled to the Soviet Union to provide instruction in Transcendental Meditation in 1990. The trip, initially scheduled to last ten days, was extended to six months and resulted in the training of 35,000 people in Transcendental Meditation.

In 1990, he proposed that the U.S. Defense Department budget $90 million to hire 7,000 to 10,000 full-time meditators to improve society. In 1991, he advocated a plan for prisons to hire TM trainers, at a cost of $1,500 per inmate, to reduce recidivism and illness among prisoners. In response to an article in The Wall Street Journal that estimated it would cost $1 billion to teach TM to all inmates in the U.S., Orme-Johnson wrote that doing so would result in a net savings of $6.2 billion annually. In 1993, Orme-Johnson proposed that the city of Omaha, Nebraska, spend $23 million for 600 meditators to end crime in the city.

In 1995, the National Institutes of Health (NIH) nominated Orme-Johnson to be an expert presenter on the effects of meditation as a relaxation technique on chronic pain and insomnia at the NIH technology assessment conference held in Bethesda, Maryland. The conclusions of the conference were reported in the Journal of the American Medical Association.

According to Orme-Johnson's website: from 1999 to 2000, Orme-Johnson was a member of the advisory board at the Center for Natural Medicine and Prevention and, from 2000 to 2002, was a Consultant for the Center for Natural Medicine and Prevention according to his website. From 2002 to 2004, he served as adjunct professor at Maharishi College of Vedic Medicine located at Maharishi University of Management.

In 2006, Orme-Johnson was the principal investigator for an NIH grant sponsored collaboration between Maharishi University of Management and the University of California, Irvine to conduct the first neuroimaging study on the effects of meditation on pain.

In 2008, the NIH National Center for Complementary and Alternative Medicine sponsored Orme-Johnson to present research on the Transcendental Meditation program and health at their workshop on "Meditation for Health Purposes", held in Bethesda, Maryland.

== Artist ==
Orme-Johnson is also a sculptor and painter. He studied visual arts at Columbia College from 1959 to 1963 in drawing, painting, sculpture and history of the movies, and at the University of Maryland from 1963 to 1968 in print making, glass blowing, sculpting and painting. He also studied painting through the Corcoran Gallery of Art in 1967.

Orme-Johnson's work has been exhibited in group shows at Columbia University, and has been shown in Fairfield, Iowa and El Paso, Texas.

== Personal life ==
After retiring from the Maharishi University of Management, Orme-Johnson moved to Florida where he worked as a research consultant and a TM teacher. In 1996, he qualified as a write-in candidate in the election for Florida House District 7.

His wife, Rhoda Orme-Johnson, also a teacher of Transcendental Meditation, was a Professor and Chairperson of the Department of Literature and Languages at Maharishi International University from 1973 to 1996, and the Administrative Dean of Maharishi European Research University from 1975 to 1976. She is also a poet, real estate agent, and the author of two books, Inside Maharishi’s Ashram: A Personal Story, and The Flow of Consciousness: Maharishi Mahesh Yogi on Literature and Language, 1971 to 1976.

Orme-Johnson's brother, William, was a professor of chemistry at Massachusetts Institute of Technology and an expert on inorganic chemistry.

== Selected papers ==
The most frequently cited papers in which DW Orme-Johnson was the lead author include:

- Orme-Johnson, D. W (1973). "Autonomic stability and transcendental meditation". Psychosomatic Medicine. 35 (4): 341–349. doi:10.1097/00006842-197307000-00008. PMID 4719021. S2CID 6082480.
- Orme-johnson, D. W; C. T Haynes (1981). "EEG Phase Coherence, Pure Consciousness, Creativity, and TM—Sidhi Experiences". International Journal of Neuroscience. 13 (4): 211–217. doi:10.3109/00207458108985804. PMID 7026478.
- Orme-Johnson D. W. (1987) Medical care utilization and the Transcendental Meditation program. Psychosomatic Medicine 1987 49(1):493-507
- Orme-Johnson, D. W; C. N Alexander; J. L Davies; H. M Chandler; W. E Larimore (1988). "International peace project in the Middle East: The effects of the Maharishi Technology of the Unified Field". Journal of Conflict Resolution. 32 (4): 776–812. doi:10.1177/0022002788032004009. S2CID 145461685.
- Orme-Johnson, D. W; C. N Alexander; J. L Davies (1990). "The effects of the Maharishi Technology of the Unified Field: Reply to a methodological critique". Journal of Conflict Resolution. 34 (4): 756–768. doi:10.1177/0022002790034004009. S2CID 121075780.
- Orme-Johnson D. W. (1994) Transcendental Meditation as an epidemiological approach to drug and alcohol abuse: theory, research, and financial impact evaluation. Alcoholism Treatment Quarterly 1994 11(1/2):119-168
- Orme-Johnson, D. W; E. Robert; P. D Herron (1997). "An Innovative Approach to Reducing Medical Care Utilization and Expenditures". American Journal of Managed Care. 3 (1): 135–144. PMID 10169245.
- Orme-Johnson, D. W; K. G Walton (1998). "Critical Issues and Trends: All Approaches to Preventing or Reversing Effects of Stress Are Not the Same". American Journal of Health Promotion. 12 (5): 297–299. doi:10.4278/0890-1171-12.5.297. PMID 10181138. S2CID 46817578.
- Orme-Johnson, D. W. (2002) "Quantifying the field effects of consciousness: From increased EEG coherence to reduced international terrorism" Proceedings: Bridging Worlds and Filling Gaps in the Science of Healing. Corona del Mar, CA: Samueli Institute for Informational Biology, 2002:326-346. (R.A. Chez, editor)
- Orme-Johnson DW, Dillbeck MC, Alexander CN. (2003) Preventing terrorism and international conflict: effects of large assemblies of participants in the Transcendental Meditation and TM-Sidhi programs. Journal of Offender Rehabilitation 2003 36(1-4):283-302
- Orme-Johnson D. W. (2003) Preventing crime though the Maharishi Effect. Journal of Offender Rehabilitation 2003 36(1-4):257-281
- Orme-Johnson D. W, Schneider RH, Son YD, Nidich S, Cho Z-H. (2006) Neuroimaging of meditation's effect on brain reactivity to pain. NeuroReport 2006 17(12):1359-1363

== Books ==
- Orme-Johnson, David W., and John T. Farrow, eds. Scientific Research on the Transcendental Meditation Program: Collected Papers. 2nd ed. Weggis, Switzerland: Maharishi European Research University Press, 1977–90. (ISBN 3-88333-001-9).
- Schmidt-Wilk, J., Orme-Johnson, D. W., Alexander, V., & Schneider, R. (Eds.), (2005). Maharishi's Vedic psychology and its applications: Honoring the lifework of Charles N. Alexander, Ph.D. Journal of Social Behavior and Personality, 620 pages.
- Alexander, C. N., Walton, K. G., Orme-Johnson, D. W., Goodman, R. S., & Pallone, N. J. (Eds.). (2003). Transcendental Meditation in Criminal Rehabilitation and Crime Prevention. Binghamton, NY: Haworth Press, 383 pages.
- Wallace, R. K. Orme-Johnson, D. W. & Dillbeck, M. C. (Eds.) (1990). Scientific research on Maharishi's Transcendental Meditation and TM-Sidhi program: Collected papers: Vol. 5. Fairfield, IA, MUM Press, 837 pages.
