= Alfred Jenkins (sports promoter) =

New Zealand physical culturist, sports administrator and promoter

Alfred Jenkins (15 March 1901 – 28 June 1976) was a New Zealand physical culturist, sports administrator and promoter. He was born in Long Gully, Victoria, Australia on 15 March 1901.
