= Alfred L. Jenkins =

American diplomat

- President: Lyndon B. Johnson
- President: Richard Nixon

Personal details
- Born: September 14, 1916 Manchester, Georgia
- Died: May 18, 2000 (aged 83) Sterling, Virginia
- Occupation: U.S. diplomat
- Committees: National Security Council senior staff

Military service
- Branch/service: American Foreign Service
- Years of service: 1946 to 1974

Alfred L. Jenkins (September 14, 1916 – May 18, 2000) was an American diplomat, lecturer and writer, born in Manchester, Georgia. He was a political authority on Chinese-American relations and served under Presidents Lyndon B. Johnson and Richard Nixon. Jenkins has been called "Mr. China" and participated in Sino-American relations for more than twenty years.

== Early life and education ==
Jenkins graduated from Emory University in 1938 and Duke University with an M.Ed. in 1976. He was also a student at the University of Chicago's National War College and attended the National College of Chiropractic in 1986.

== Career ==
He served in the American Foreign Service from 1946 to 1974 before becoming a freelance writer. Jenkins served in China from 1946 to 1955. He was a member of the U.S. National Security Council from 1966 to 1969. Jenkins was the senior inspector of the U.S. State Department Foreign Service and a member of the National Security Council senior staff of President Lyndon B. Johnson. He often submitted memos directly to the President and was, at times, critical of current American policy towards China which was focused on trade, travel and U.N. representation rather than its possible involvement in the Asia–Pacific region (including Vietnam).

Under the Nixon administration he was the director of the State Department's Office of Asian Communist Affairs. In 1970 he traveled to Paris to exchange information with the French and British concerning affairs with China. He traveled with Secretary of State Henry Kissinger on an unpublicized diplomatic mission to China in October 1971. Jenkins advised Kissinger and President Nixon on all Chinese diplomatic relations and was instrumental in planning the U.S.’s Chinese missions. His insights into Chinese-American relations gave him a key role in Nixon’s historical diplomatic mission and visit to China in February 1972. Jenkins was considered Kissinger's "right-hand man" and had final responsibility for drafting the secret "Talking Papers", which served as a guide for U.S. negotiations with China.

In 1972 Jenkins was a speaker at a symposium held at the Massachusetts Institute of Technology and hosted by Maharishi Mahesh Yogi. He was given the Superior Service Award by the U.S. State Department in 1973. Jenkins was the chief liaison officer in Peking, China, from 1973 to 1974 before becoming a professional lecturer and writer. In 1975 he appeared on the NBC TV show Tomorrow and channel KSCI in Los Angeles, California, to discuss Transcendental Meditation. He served as chairman of the board of trustees of Maharishi International University for three years.

After retiring from the Foreign Service, due to the influence of Joseph Janse, D.C., N.D., a well-known and revered figure in natural medicine and longtime President of National College of Chiropractic (now National University of Health Sciences) in Lombard, IL, in 1981 Jenkins began his studies toward a Doctorate of Chiropractic and graduated shortly before his 70th birthday. He practiced natural medicine as a primary care physician in Gleneden Beach, Oregon, for a number of years, but retired when his wife Martha died. Jenkins returned to Alexandria, VA where he lived out his final years.

In 1993 Jenkins published an autobiography called Country, Conscience and Caviar: A Diplomat's Journey in the Company of History.
