= Bevan Morris =

Australian-born American academic and politician (1949–2026)

- Born: 3 March 1949; Adelaide, South Australia, Australia
- Died: 26 February 2026 (aged 76); Fairfield, Iowa, U.S.
- Education: Gonville and Caius College, Cambridge; Maharishi European Research University
- Occupations: University president, politician
- Employer: Maharishi University of Management
- Organization: Transcendental Meditation movement
- Political party: A founder of the Natural Law Party

Bevan H. Morris (3 March 1949 – 26 February 2026) was an Australian-born American academic and politician who was the president of Maharishi University of Management in Fairfield, Iowa, for 36 years and a founder of the Natural Law Party.

== Early life and education ==
Morris received his B.A. and M.A. degrees in psychology and philosophy from Gonville and Caius College, Cambridge. He earned a master's degree and a PhD in the Science of Creative Intelligence from Maharishi European Research University (MERU) in Vlodrop, Netherlands. Morris also held a Doctorate of World Peace from MERU in Switzerland.

== Career ==
=== Educator ===
In September 1980, Morris was appointed president and chairman of the board of trustees of the Maharishi International University, which was renamed Maharishi University of Management (MUM) in 1995. During his tenure, there was expansion of the university campus, and accreditation through the PhD level. In 1994, he was reported to be the lowest-paid college president in Iowa, receiving an annual salary of $9,000. He was also on the board of trustees of the Maharishi School of the Age of Enlightenment. Morris became the emeritus chairman of the board of trustees of MUM in 2009 after having served as chairman for 30 years, and he continued to serve as its president. Morris was the International President of Maharishi Vedic Universities, a network of institutions in Europe, Asia, Africa, and South America. In March 2012, Morris toured 14 African countries, including Kenya, to promote Consciousness Based Education. He retired as president in 2016.

=== Politician ===
Morris was a founder and national chairman of the U.S. Natural Law Party (NLP). He took leave of absence from MUM to oversee John Hagelin's first campaign for U.S. President, in 1992, and praised Hagelin's "highly coherent brain". Morris was described, in 1992, as the party's spokesman on education. He was listed in 1993 as a candidate in the Commonwealth of Australia legislative election and Morris was reported to be the leader of the Australian NLP in 1997.

=== Other ===
From 1975 to 1979, Morris was the international coordinator for MERU. In 1984, Morris toured the United States seeking practitioners of the TM-Sidhi program to form a group in Fairfield, Iowa. Morris was appointed chairman of the Maharishi Council of Supreme Intelligence of Age of Enlightenment in 1987. He worked directly with Maharishi Mahesh Yogi for many years and traveled with him to locations all over the world. He visited more than 120 countries, meeting with leaders in education, government, business, and other areas to tell them about Consciousness-Based Education, Maharishi International University, and Maharishi's programs to create world peace.

== Personal life and death ==
As of 2009, Morris was living in Adelaide, Australia. He died on 26 February 2026, at the age of 76.
