= Maharishi International University =

Private university in Fairfield, Iowa

Coordinates: 41.0180°N 91.9688°W

- Former name: Maharishi University of Management (1995–2019)
- Motto: Higher Education for Higher Consciousness
- Type: Private university
- Established: 1971; 55 years ago
- Founder: Maharishi Mahesh Yogi
- Accreditation: Higher Learning Commission
- Religious affiliation: Transcendental Meditation movement
- Endowment: $9.0 million
- President: Tony Nader
- Faculty: 67 full-time, 31 part-time
- Students: 1210
- Undergraduates: 256 full-time 26 part-time
- Postgraduates: 498 full-time 430 part-time
- Location: Fairfield, Iowa, United States
- Campus: Rural, 370 acres (1.5 km^{2})
- Colors: Green and gold
- Nickname: Pioneers
- Sporting affiliations: USCAA
- Website: miu.edu

Maharishi International University (MIU), formerly Maharishi University of Management, is a private university in Fairfield, Iowa, United States. It was founded in 1971 by Maharishi Mahesh Yogi and practices a "consciousness-based education" system that includes the Transcendental Meditation technique. Its founding principles are the development of the full potential of the individual, fulfilling economic aspirations while maximizing proper use of the environment and bringing spiritual fulfillment and happiness to humanity.

The university is accredited through the doctoral level by the Higher Learning Commission (HLC) and offers degree programs in art, business, education, communications, mathematical science, literature, physiology & health, regenerative organic agriculture, Vedic Science and sustainable living.

The original campus in Goleta, California, moved in 1974 to a 370-acre campus in Fairfield, Iowa. During the 1990s many older buildings were demolished and replaced with green technology and the principles of ancient Vedic architecture. The university features an academic "block system" (only one subject for four weeks) and a diverse, multinational student body. It is said to offer an organic, vegetarian food program.

== History ==
=== 1971–2004 ===
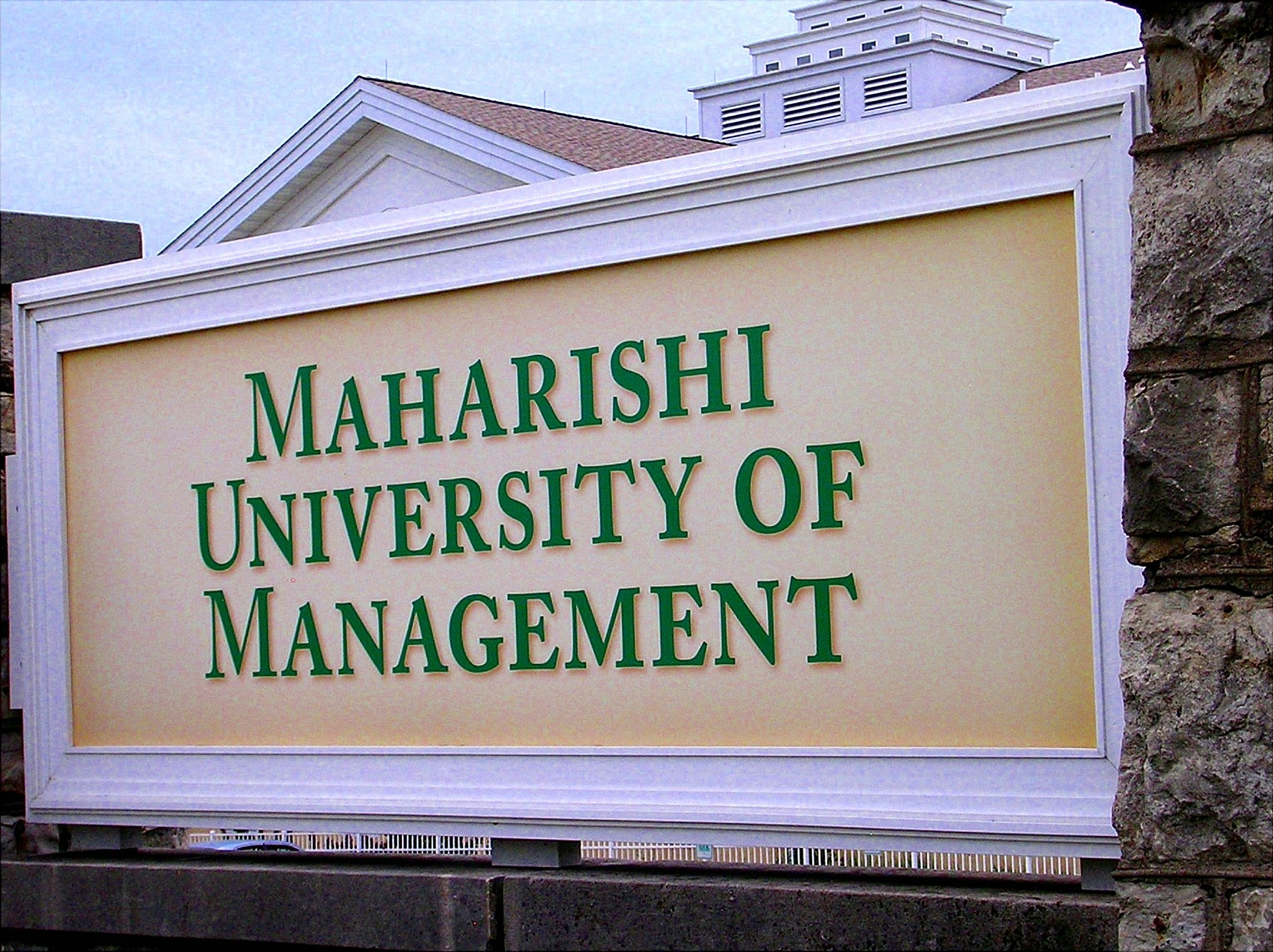
University sign at campus entrance

The concept for a university came out of a "series of international symposia on Science of Creative Intelligence" (SCI) attended by notable academics. It was established in 1971 by Nat Goldhaber. It was created with the belief that a school that incorporated the "philosophy and techniques of Transcendental Meditation" would create an "unusual contribution to higher education".

It was inaugurated by Maharishi Mahesh Yogi, and Robert Keith Wallace assumed his position as the first university president in 1973. Its first location was an apartment complex in Goleta, California. The university enrolled 700 students during its first year of operation. In August 1974, the university purchased the campus of the bankrupt Parsons College in Fairfield, Iowa, for $2.5 million and relocated there.

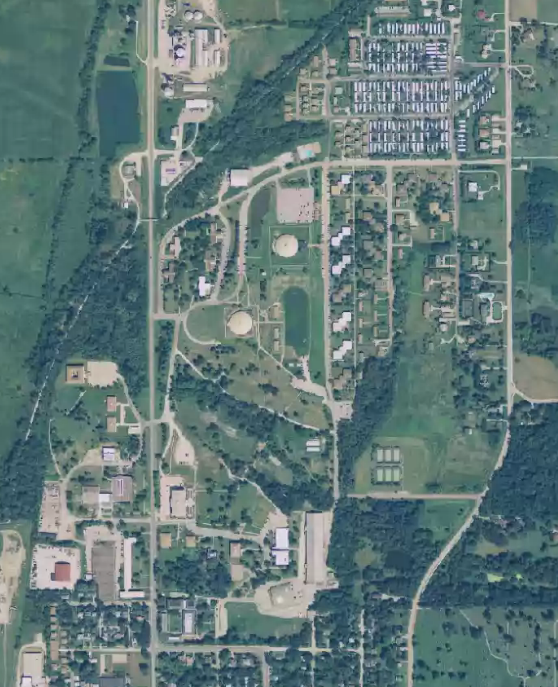
Aerial photograph of the Maharishi International University campus

In 1975, the freshman and sophomore years consisted of interdisciplinary studies, and were organized in a modular format, with each course lasting a few weeks or months. All students, regardless of their previous education, were required to attend 24 interdisciplinary courses, some of which consisted of pre-recorded video tapes of "resident faculty" who were not on campus, while graduate students and teaching assistants played the video tapes and conducted discussions. Nobel Prize winner Melvin Calvin said that, even though he participated in a symposium on SCI, the use of his name in the MIU catalogue was "perilously close to false advertising". John Lewis, a professor at Massachusetts Institute of Technology (MIT) who created video-taped lectures for MIU, was supportive, saying that TM "unblocks the student's pathways to education". During this period, an open admissions policy was instituted, and transfer students were welcomed regardless of their academic history. In 1976, the accreditation evaluation team from the North Central Association of Colleges and Secondary Schools said the 19 senior and 20 assistant faculty were "creative in their vision for higher education and eminently qualified", and the university was granted "candidate for accreditation" status. At that time, faculty and administrators were paid "approximately the same base salary of $275 per month", with additional compensation "on a sliding scale for those with spouses and children", plus free housing in university dormitories. On campus, drugs and alcohol were "shunned" and a "strong sense of community" was said to pervade the institution.

Bevan Morris was appointed president and chairman of Maharishi International University's board of trustees in 1979. The following year, the university received accreditation through the doctoral level by the Higher Learning Commission, and became a member of the North Central Association of Colleges and Schools (NCACS). 1981 saw the completion of two 20,000 square foot meditation buildings called Golden Domes, that were built on campus for daily group practice of the Transcendental Meditation (TM) and TM-Sidhi programs. By this time the Henn Mansion, Trustee Gymnasium and Ballard Hall buildings, built in the early 1900s, showed rapid deterioration. These buildings were scheduled to be demolished but the university spent $500,000 to restore Henn Mansion, beginning in 1984, and nominated six other buildings for the National Historic Register.

In July 1983, the Argus-Press reported that competing meditation seminar teacher, Robin Woodsworth Carlsen, had criticized and ridiculed the university in a full-page advertisement placed in a local newspaper and had filed a lawsuit against the university. As a result, "many students" who were distributing Carlsen's literature on campus were asked to leave the campus and several were suspended with their meditation dome admission privileges revoked.

In December 1983, the university hosted a three-week "Taste of Utopia" conference with more than 7,000 participants and practitioners of the TM-Sidhi program "from around the world". MIU president Morris later reported that research data indicated the conference had reduced violence in war-torn areas and inspired an increase in the Dow Jones stock index via the Maharishi Effect. By 1992, the university had 800 students from more than 70 countries, paying approximately $10,000 a year for their tuition and board.

In 1995, Maharishi International University changed its name to Maharishi University of Management (MUM). As part of its master plan to rebuild and expand the campus using natural materials and Maharishi Vastu Architecture design principles, many of the Parsons College buildings, which had high maintenance costs, were demolished, including Foster Hall. In 2019, the name was changed back to the original Maharishi International University.

In 2000, local preservationists protested the demolition of Parsons Hall, built in 1915, and Barhydt Chapel, designed in 1911 by Henry K. Holsman. University officials said that MIU would donate the buildings to any community group who could raise the $1 million needed to move what the local newspaper described as an "ailing building". In response to protests the university ensured the survival of the chapel's plaques, pipe organ, and stained glass windows, which are now displayed at the Fairfield Arts & Convention Center. Between 2000 and 2005, the university demolished Carnegie Hall, Parsons Hall (1915), Barhydt Chapel (1911), Blum Stadium (1966), Laser Tower, the dining hall, and 38 dormitory-style "pods". Seven student "residence halls" with single rooms were completed in 2005 using eco-friendly designs, natural materials and geo-thermal heating.

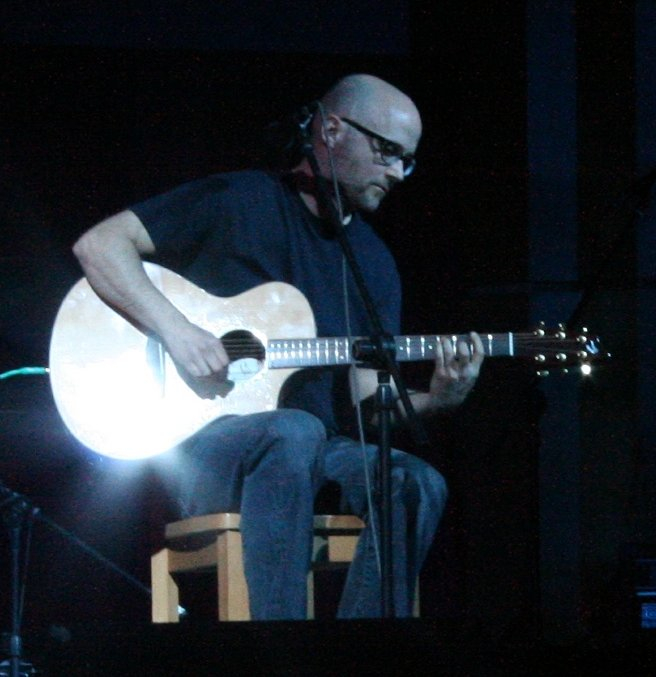
Moby performing in 2008

A stabbing incident occurred in 2004, when MIU student Shuvender Sem attacked two other students in separate incidents on the same day. He stabbed the first student with a pen and, hours later, fatally stabbed Levi Butler with a knife. Sem was found not guilty due to insanity and the university settled a lawsuit that charged it with negligence.

=== 2005–present ===
Beginning in 2005, film director David Lynch hosted an annual "David Lynch Weekend for World Peace and Meditation" at MIU. The 2008 event included musical performances by Donovan, Moby, and Chrysta Bell. The fourth annual David Lynch Weekend of November 2009 featured Donovan, MIU professor John Hagelin, and the American debut of James McCartney, who performed at the Fairfield Arts & Convention Center. The weekend conference was intended to appeal to those "interested in creativity, film, art, sustainable living, organic agriculture, brain development, consciousness, meditation, natural medicine, renewable living [and] peace".

By 2007, the university had over 45 campus buildings, including 17 classroom and administrative buildings. Between 1974 and 2008, a total of 43 buildings were demolished and 70 new buildings erected in their place. At that time, MIU had 948 students (813 full time) of whom 78% were foreign students – the third-highest number of foreign students at an Iowa university that year. 71% of these students were enrolled in a graduate degree program. The largest age group was 25–29 years of age (42%). In this same year, MIU awarded 125 Master's degrees and 34 Bachelor degrees.

In 2008, the Argiro Student Center was completed, featuring "the most advanced green technologies" and included dining areas, student cafe, book store, interdenominational chapel, auditorium, classrooms, exercise studio and student government offices.

In 2010, there were 1,210 students enrolled – 754 full-time and 456 part-time students, with 928 full- and part-time graduate students.

Enrollment in 2013 included 337 students from 54 countries and the university graduated the largest class in its history. That year the university began offering a program called the David Lynch MA in Film. The program's segments include courses called Advanced Narrative, Advanced Screenwriting and Acting for Film. Other features include a three-month film project and question and answer sessions with Lynch both in-person and via Skype. As of August 2013, 826 graduate and undergraduate full-time students and 365 part-time students were enrolled at MIU. The following year, Jim Carrey delivered the university's commencement address and received an honorary doctorate for his achievements as a comedian, artist, author, and philanthropist; his address has frequently been described as one of the best in the genre.

In 2016 Bevan Morris retired as president and the board of trustees appointed John Hagelin.

== Administration and faculty ==
The board of trustees consists of 37 members and is chaired by Ed Malloy, former mayor of Fairfield. Other members include Bevan Morris, chairman emeritus of Maharishi International University, John Hagelin, honorary chairman, and Jeffrey Abramson, a partner in The Tower Companies. Past trustees include Ramani Ayer, former chairman of The Hartford Financial Services Group Inc., retired major general and author Franklin M. Davis Jr., Theodore Dreier, an engineer and educator who was one of the founders of Black Mountain College, and Alfred L. Jenkins, a career diplomat who served as chairman of MIU for three years.

Notable past and present faculty at MIU include Arthur Aron and Elaine Aron, David Orme-Johnson, Ashley Deans, and Elaine Ingham.

In 2007 the university had 52 faculty members and average salaries for full-time faculty ranged from $6,678 for some instructors and assistant professors to $19,595 for full professors. In 2011, MIU was one of more than 1,000 corporations which requested a waiver to the Patient Protection and Affordable Care Act's requirement to offer maximum payouts of $750,000 per employee.

== Campus ==
The campus sits on 370 acres (1.5 km^{2}) located 50 miles (80 km) west of the Mississippi River. The grounds include wooded areas, fields and two small lakes with U.S. News & World Report categorizing the campus setting as "urban".

The original Parsons College campus included 60-80 buildings before closing due to bankruptcy, standing empty and being purchased by MIU. The Library Building continues to be used and houses the main library, classrooms, administrative offices, multimedia computer lab, Unity Art Gallery, Campus Security and Facilities Management. The library catalog includes 140,000 volumes, 60 reference databases and Internet reference resources, 7,000 electronic books, 12,000 full-text periodicals, special collections including the Science of Creative Intelligence Reserve Collection, Journal of Modern Science and Vedic Science, PhD dissertations by university students, and a Vedic literature collection. A campus-wide closed-circuit television network includes 10,000 hours of video- and audio-taped courses, conferences and presentations. Additional facilities include network plug-in ports for laptop users, support for international distance education students, and DVD/video rentals with over 1,500 titles. Inter-library loans include books and articles and access to the University of Iowa Library as well as to libraries worldwide.

Many structures have been replaced since 1974 as part of MIU's master plan for reconstruction and expansion which includes careful attention to environmental conservation, incorporating renewable energy, state-of-the-art building technologies, natural building materials and Maharishi Sthapatya Veda principles of architecture. Two golden domes were erected between 1980 and 1981 and are used for daily group practice of the Transcendental Meditation and the TM-Sidhi program and have been called "particle accelerators of consciousness" by the university's founder. The campus was "thoroughly rebuilt" in the 1990s and seven student residence halls, with single rooms, were completed in 2005 using eco-friendly designs, natural materials and geo-thermal heating. By 2007, the university had over 45 campus buildings, including 17 classroom and administrative buildings. Between 1974 and 2008, a total of 43 buildings had been demolished and 70 new buildings had been erected in their place. The newly-created Dreier Building houses the offices of Admissions, Alumni, Campus Reconstruction, Development, the dean of faculty, the deans of women and men, the Enrollment Center, the executive vice-president, legal counsel, Human Resources, and six classrooms.

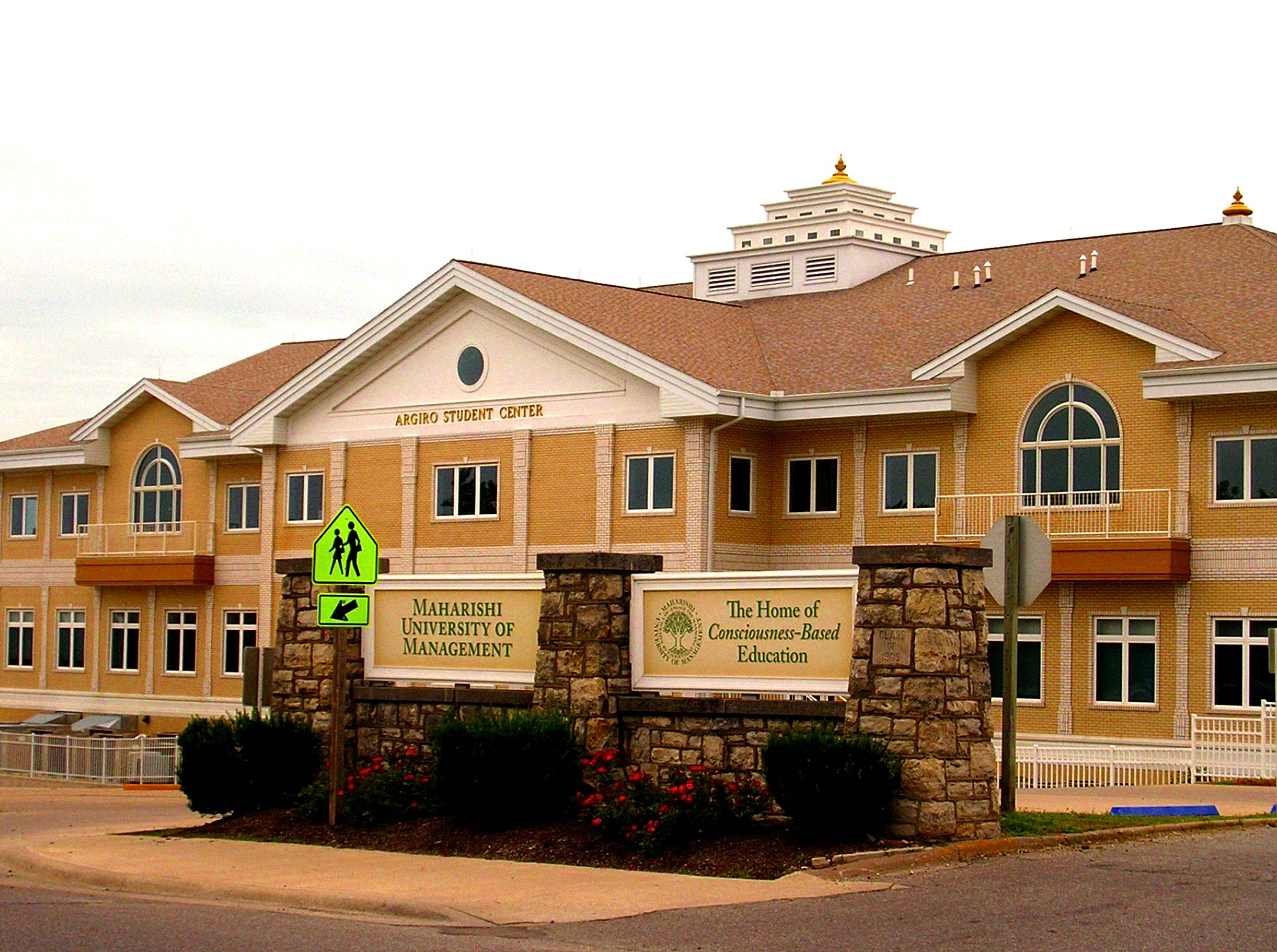
Argiro Student Center and dining hall

The 50,000 sq ft (5,000 m^{2}) Argiro Student Center was completed in 2008 and houses a large, open reception area, dining rooms, kitchens, student cafe, student book store and shopping area, interdenominational chapel, an auditorium, classrooms, exercise studio, and student government offices. The building incorporates many principles of Vedic architecture such as eastern orientation, specific room placement size and proportions, energy efficiency, day lighting, non-toxic and natural building materials and "higher than normal" energy efficiency.

In 2012, the university completed construction of a Sustainable Learning Center (SLC) building. According to the university, the building sets a "new global standard for green buildings" by incorporating local building materials and being completely energy self-sufficient, even during its construction. It was designed to meet the Living Building Challenge requirements and become one of three buildings in the US to meet that standard as well as LEED Platinum certification. It houses both research and classroom activities and allows students to "interactively monitor performance and energy efficiency". University officials hope this building proves that the county has the expertise for technological jumps of this kind.

== Academics ==
The university offers Bachelor of Arts degrees in 13 areas including Vedic science and sustainable living. According to a 2006 report in The Des Moines Register, MIU "is establishing itself as a leader in sustainable living architecture" among Iowa's colleges and universities and offers a sustainable living program. The program includes a Bachelor of Science in Sustainable Living and an Master of Business Administration in Sustainable Business. MIU is listed with the Institute for Sustainability as a university that offers eco-curriculums and a Bachelor of Science in "sustainable living/environmental science" which teaches students methods for designing and maintaining environmentally friendly communities. Course content includes sustainable practices for agriculture, technology, architecture, landscape design, business and the ecology of living systems.

Maharishi International University is reported to be the only university in the United States that offers a PhD degree in the Neuroscience of Human Consciousness. The university participates in a state-sponsored, fast-track license program for school teachers.

The university is accredited by the Higher Learning Commission. The university's business programs (BA, MBA, and PhD) are accredited by the International Assembly for Collegiate Business Education (IACBE).

Maharishi International University operates on a block system. Students take one course at a time during a four-week period. MIU also offers undergraduate programs in China.

=== Consciousness-Based Education ===
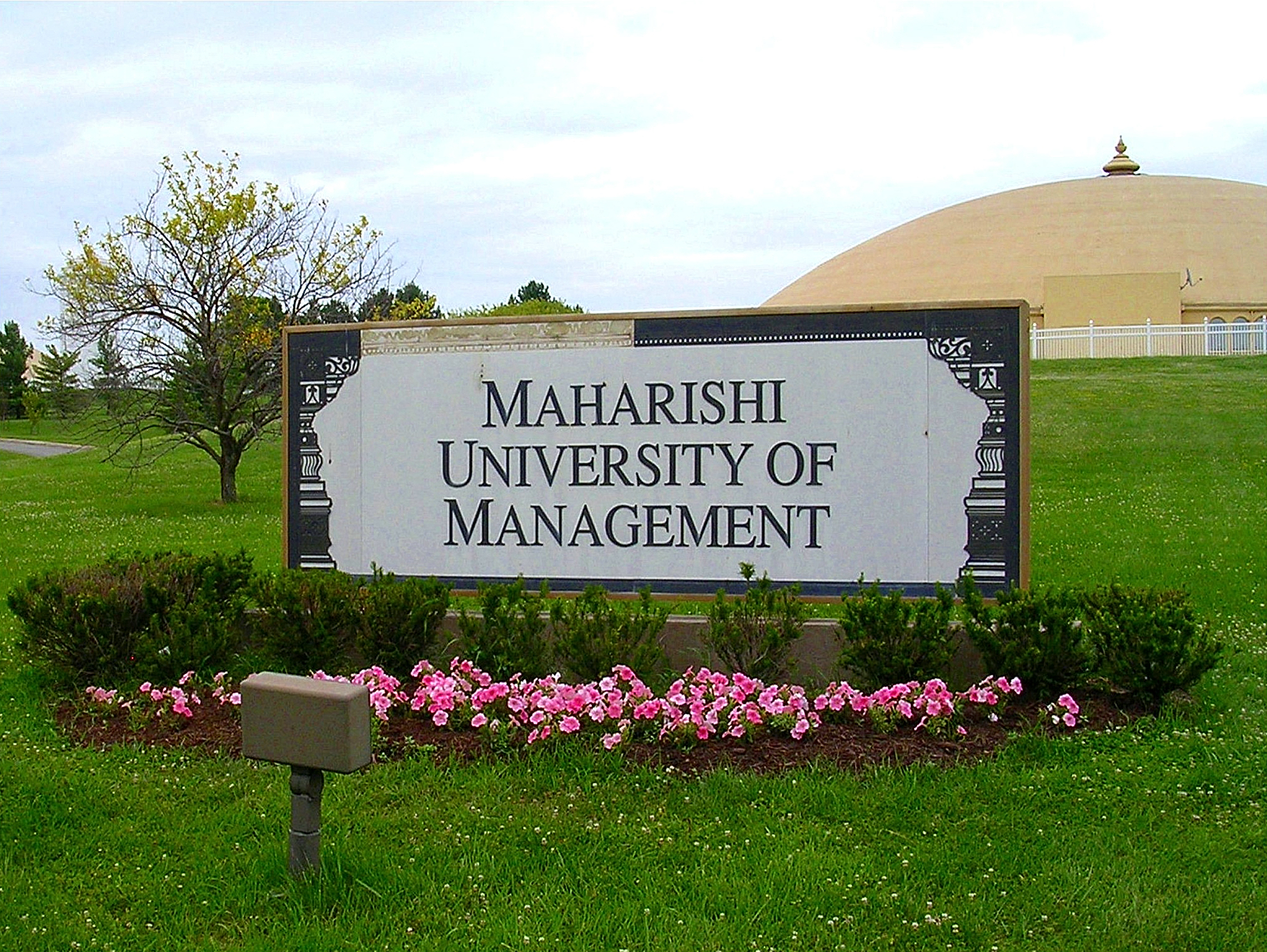
Golden dome for the group practice of the Transcendental Meditation and TM-Sidhi programs

Maharishi International University is committed to achieving its goals through Consciousness-Based Education (CBE) which aims to unfold "creative potential" and create life in harmony with the laws of nature. CBE includes traditional subjects while simultaneously cultivating the student's potential from within. As a component of Consciousness-Based Education, students and faculty practice the Transcendental Meditation technique twice daily. Both Consciousness-Based Education and Science of Creative Intelligence (SCI) are said to include the personal experience and intellectual understanding of consciousness. Classes at MIU present subjects such as art, economics, physics, literature, and psychology in the context of these universal principles of consciousness. Before 2009 MIU freshmen and transfer students began their first semester with the 33-lesson SCI course. The university president, Morris, has credited the knowledge and principles of SCI with contributing to the success of its graduates and SCI degrees have been awarded to Morris, Doug Henning, Mike Tompkins, Benjamin Feldman, the finance minister for Global Country of World Peace, and author John Gray.

== Student life ==
=== Health and ecology ===
The university's endeavor to create a sustainable campus include the use of green, energy-efficient architecture and community planning that incorporates Maharishi Sthapatya Veda architecture – a system of country, town, village, and home planning that utilizes natural building materials and procedures. The university operates an organic vegetable farm including a 1-acre (4,000 m^{2}), year-round greenhouse, which provides students and faculty with a 100% organic food program. In 2011, the university participated in the Southeast Alaska Conservation Council's solar energy project, Sustain Angoon.

=== Sports and recreation ===
Maharishi International University students compete in numerous team and individual sports. Men's and women's golf is an intercollegiate sport; men's and women's soccer is a club sport. Intramural sports include soccer, archery, badminton, baseball, basketball, fencing, field hockey, football, rock climbing, sailing, swimming, tennis, ultimate Frisbee and weight lifting.

=== Residence halls ===
Single, furnished rooms are standard for all students to ensure quiet and privacy, and include high-speed Internet connections. Most residence halls are equipped with exercise and TV rooms. Freshmen are required to live on campus. Compared to other colleges, MIU offers dorm rooms to a higher than average percentage of its students.

== Research ==
Maharishi International University publishes the Journal of Modern Science and Vedic Science. MIU faculty members have published on Transcendental Meditation in scientific journals including the American Heart Association's journals, Hypertension and Stroke.

Since the establishment of its research facilities, the university has been awarded over 150 federal, state, and private grants and contracts totaling over $24 million, including funding from the NIH's National Center for Complementary and Alternative Medicine and its Heart, Lung, and Blood Institute. In 2012, the United States Department of Defense granted MIU and the San Diego Veterans Administration Medical Center $2.4 million to research the effectiveness of Transcendental Meditation for the treatment of Post Traumatic Stress Disorder.

=== Institute for Natural Medicine and Prevention ===
The Institute for Natural Medicine and Prevention (INMP) (formerly the Center for Natural Medicine and Prevention) has received grants totaling over $10.5 million for research on prevention-oriented natural medicine. The university had received more than $20 million in funding from different branches of the National Institutes of Health as of 2002 The university's Department of Physiology and the Institute for Natural Medicine and Prevention received $8 million from the National Institutes of Health National Center for Complementary and Alternative Medicine (NCCAM) to establish the first research center in the U.S. specializing in "natural" preventive medicine for minorities.

=== Other institutes and centers ===
- The Institute of Science, Technology and Public Policy (ISTPP) was founded by John Hagelin to identify, scientifically evaluate and implement proven, prevention-oriented, forward-looking solutions to critical national and global problems
- The Center for Advanced Military Science (CAMS), whose founder and director is David R. Leffler
- The Center for Brain, Consciousness, and Cognition, whose director is faculty member, Fred Travis

=== Views on research ===
Lola Williamson, who practiced the TM-Sidhi program until 1981, wrote a book called Transcendent in America: Hindu-Inspired Meditation Movements as New Religion. In the book, she cites two former professors who in the late 1980s "testified against the research practices conducted at the university". In the book, she writes that former MIU professor of economics and business law Anthony DeNaro alleged in 1986 that there was "a very serious and deliberate pattern of fraud ... designed to misrepresent the TM movement as a science (not a cult), and fraudulently claim and obtain tax exempt status with the IRS". Williamson writes in her book that Dennis Roark, former dean of faculty and chair of the physics department in the 1970s, was a "witness to routine suppression of negative data" and that Roark wrote in a 1987 letter that it was his "belief that the many scientific claims both to the factual evidence of unique, beneficial effects of T.M. and physics are not only without any reasonable basis, but in fact in many ways fraudulent". Roark said "he had questioned" MIU faculty member Michael Dillbeck regarding his studies of brain wave coherence using EEG measurements during practice of the TM-Sidhi program, and that Dilbeck confirmed that it was impossible to make EEG measurements while the subjects are moving. Williamson writes in her book that Roark questioned other investigators "regarding the alleged reduction in crime if enough people practice TM or the TM-Sidhi program" and they "confirmed that they had suppressed negative evidence". The EEG research referred to by Roark, which required researchers to make EEG measurements during the TM-Sidhi program, was subsequently published in two separate studies in the International Journal of Neuroscience. The editor-in-chief, Sydney Weinstein, said that the studies published in his journal are reviewed by "a distinguished group of scientists from leading universities," and added, "Not once have these scientists ever questioned the integrity or scientific validity of the papers on Transcendental Meditation."

In 2002, The Gazette (Cedar Rapids and Iowa City) and Chicago Sun-Times reported that although "a few years ago" many "major medical schools" would have "turned up their noses" at the studies Maharishi International University was conducting, "things have changed" and MIU has received so many offers that it has "turned away" collaboration proposals from a few institutions. According to an MIU spokesperson, the university had received almost $18 million in grant support from the National Institutes of Health in the prior 15 years and "its researchers are strict about scientific standards because they work more often with other, larger universities" including the University of Iowa; University of California, Irvine; and University of Hawaiʻi. The article reports that Maharishi University and the University of Iowa were working on a study that looked at the effects of holistic therapy on heart disease.

According to news reports in 2003, MIU's Center for Natural Medicine and Prevention (CNMP) was in collaboration with a "growing list of mainstream universities" including Howard University, the Medical College of Wisconsin, the University of Pennsylvania, Charles R. Drew University of Medicine and Science and the University of California at Irvine. According to the article, "mainstream medical researchers – including many scientists suspicious of spiritualism" no longer believe that MIU's research is junk science.

== Reception ==
Maharishi International University has received both criticism and acclaim. Author Samuel Schuman reports that while many in the higher education community did not take the university seriously when it began in 1974, the college has "persisted cheerfully" for more than three decades and its achievements and results are "incontestably impressive". Some members of the local community were initially against the university with 540 residents signing a petition protesting the local school board for allowing four MIU students to visit the public schools as observers. However, author William Jefferson reports that by 1976, 200 local people had "taken up Transcendental Meditation themselves" and compared to the "wild and woolly" students of the prior college, "nearly all the residents now agree that they [MIU students] are nice people to have around".

A 1976 article in The New York Times described the campus as a "cheerful, optimistic place where people smile a lot and tend to be considerate and trusting". In 1992, The New York Times reported that the university was a place where all students and faculty meditate, and all the Maharishi's teachings are woven into mathematics, physics and every other subject, similar to colleges with strong religious affiliations, while noting it is "an accredited university with grant-winning faculty members and competitive students". The article goes on to say that even as the university gains research grants and subsequent credibility, it also faces controversy. For example, one critic, 1979 alumnus Curtis Mailloux, called the campus a "coercive environment" with a "propensity for fraudulent research". Accreditation officials say they are aware of these accusations and "have been aggressive in checking Marahishi [sic] International's academic freedom". The deputy director of the North Central Association of Colleges and Schools (NCACS), Steven D. Crow, says "Every move the university's made has been monitored" and MIU's library, faculty, academic mission and classroom space have been deemed appropriate. At the same time, John W. Patterson a professor at Iowa State University, has harshly criticized The North Central Association's evaluation, saying it "does nothing more than to lend credibility to these crackpots". The article also reports that many non-students have moved to the city of Fairfield "so they can meditate in the [campus meditation] domes".

In 1986, seven "former devotees" filed a fraud suit against the Maharishi saying they paid thousands of dollars for lessons at Maharishi International University that were designed to reduce stress, improve memory, reverse aging, and develop clairvoyance and levitation. One plaintiff said that after ten years he had not acquired any of the special abilities that were promised. According to reviews of the 1992 book, Heaven on Earth – Dispatches from America’s Spiritual Frontier, author and reporter Michael D'Antonio wrote that the MIU physics department was teaching theories that he believed were "dead wrong" and alleged that the university had taken Transcendental Meditation "into a grandiose narcissistic dream, a form of intellectual bondage, that they call enlightenment".

Maharishi International University is listed in Peterson's 440 Great Colleges for Top Students 2010. According to the National Survey of Student Engagement MIU scored in the top 3% for "active and collaborative learning," in the top 4% for "enriching educational experience," in the top 7% for "student/faculty interaction," in the top 8% for "supportive campus environment," and in the top 26% for "level of academic challenge." MIU graduates also gave their college experience a "higher than average satisfaction" rating as recorded in the "annual ACT alumni survey." Specifically, 73% said they would choose MIU again, more than twice the national average of 32%.

The university has been categorized as a "Sierra Club Cool School" and in 2014 was ranked as the fourth best environmental science school by career guide website, Environmental Science.

== In popular culture ==
The Beach Boys recorded their 1978 album M.I.U. Album on the campus, and named it after the university. Man on the Moon, a biopic of entertainer Andy Kaufman, includes a scene at Maharishi International University in which Kaufman is asked to leave a retreat because his behavior was unbecoming an enlightened individual. In October 2011, Oprah Winfrey visited MIU, toured the campus and attended a group meditation in the golden dome for women. Video footage of her visit to the MIU campus was shown on an episode of her show.

== Notable alumni and faculty ==
Name	Notability	Notes
Michael C. Dimick	Natural Law Party candidate	Received MBA degree
John Gray	Author	Has been called an alumnus of MIU
John Gray	Author	Other sources list him as an alumnus of Maharishi European Research University (MERU) in Switzerland
Peter McWilliams	Self-help author	
Ron Parker	Canadian Natural Law Party candidate	Received his PhD in physics from MIU
Jeff Peckman	ufologist	Attended for one year
Jennie Rothenberg-Gritz	Senior editor at The Atlantic	
Mike Zak	Video game developer	Received his master's degree in digital media from the university.
Ashley Deans	Executive director of Maharishi School of the Age of Enlightenment.	
Richard Rossi	Filmmaker, Writer, Musician.	MFA, David Lynch School of Cinematic Arts, 2026
Nat Goldhaber	Original founder of the University	
Bevan Morris	Former president of Maharishi International University	
David Orme-Johnson	Researcher, former professor at Maharishi International University	

In 1994, the son of Mozambique's president, Joaquim Chissano, and several children of the country's Cabinet members, attended the university on scholarships.
