= Mike Tompkins (politician) =

American politician

- Born: Mike Tompkins; Boston, Massachusetts, U.S.
- Education: Harvard University
- Political party: Natural Law Party

Mike Tompkins is a U.S. politician who was the Natural Law Party vice presidential candidate during the 1992 and 1996 presidential elections.

== Education and career ==
Born in Boston, Massachusetts, he graduated from Harvard University in 1970 and completed his post-graduate studies at Maharishi European Research University (MERU) in Seelisberg, Switzerland in 1984, where he received a doctorate in the Science of Creative Intelligence. He became an associate director of the Institute of Science, Technology and Public Policy, a nonprofit organization affiliated with the Maharishi Mahesh Yogi that defines itself as a "progressive policy think tank."

== Political campaigns ==
In 1992, Tompkins joined John Hagelin as the first national candidates for the Natural Law Party. Hagelin, a quantum physicist, was the director of the Institute of Science, Technology and Public Policy and director of the physics department at the Maharishi University of Management in Fairfield, Iowa. Hagelin and Tompkins received ballot placement in 32 states and their campaign qualified for federal matching funds.

In 1996, Hagelin and Tompkins ran again as the presidential and vice presidential candidates on the Natural Law Party. During a campaign stop at the University of Houston, Tompkins defended the party's place in the U.S. political landscape by stating, "The Natural Law Party was founded as an alternative to the Republicans and Democrats, and an answer to the great many issues and great many solutions that were not being brought to the public. We are building this party as a permanent part of the American political landscape. We want to win and influence debate…(America has) the least democratic society. We have made a political system that excludes new voices, new people and new ideas."

Hagelin and Tomkins received 39,000 votes, or 0.04% of the total voter input, in 1992. In 1996, they were on the ballot in 44 states and received 110,000 votes, or 0.1% of the total voter input. In 2000, Hagelin ran for president again on the Natural Law Party, but Tompkins was replaced as the vice presidential candidate by Internet entrepreneur Nat Goldhaber.

Preceded by (none)	Natural Law Party vice presidential candidate 1992 (lost) 1996 (lost)	Succeeded by Nat Goldhaber
