= John Hagelin =

American transcendental meditator (born 1954)

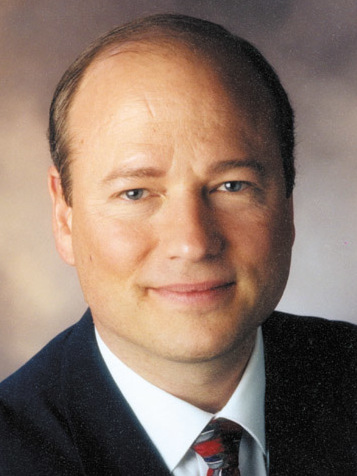
- Born: John Samuel Hagelin; June 9, 1954 (age 72); Pittsburgh, Pennsylvania, U.S.
- Education: A.B. (physics), Dartmouth College, 1975; M.A. (physics), Harvard University, 1976; Ph.D. (physics), Harvard University, 1981
- Employer: Maharishi University of Management
- Known for: Three-time candidate for U.S. President, leader of U.S. Transcendental Meditation movement, president of Maharishi University of Management
- Title: Raja of Invincible America, president of the US Peace Government, and others
- Political party: Natural Law Party
- Spouse: Kara Anastasio (2010)
- Awards: Kilby, Ig Nobel
- Website: www.hagelin.org

John Samuel Hagelin (/heɪɡɛlɪn/; born June 9, 1954) is an American physicist and the leader of the Transcendental Meditation (TM) movement in the United States. He was president of Maharishi International University (MIU), formerly Maharishi University of Management (MUM), in Fairfield, Iowa, and honorary chair of its board of trustees.

In 1981, Hagelin graduated with a Ph.D. in physics from Harvard University and then did several months of post-doctoral research at CERN. He went on to do post-doctoral work at the SLAC National Accelerator Laboratory (SLAC). In 1984, he became a professor of physics at MIU, and later became the university's president. Hagelin postulates that his extended version of unified field theory is identified with Maharishi Mahesh Yogi's "unified field of consciousness", but this view was rejected by "virtually every theoretical physicist in the world" in 2006. Hagelin has published over 70 papers about particle physics, electroweak unification, grand unification, supersymmetry, and cosmology, most of them in academic scientific journals, and co-authored a 1983 paper in "Physics Letters B", that became one of the 103 most-cited articles in the physical sciences in 1983 and 1984. A 1984 paper by Hagelin and John Ellis in "Nuclear Physics B", "Supersymmetric relics from the big bang", had been cited over 500 times by 2007.

Hagelin stood as a candidate for President of the United States for the Natural Law Party, a party founded by the TM movement, in the 1992, 1996 and 2000 elections. He is the author of Manual for a Perfect Government (1998), which sets out how to apply "natural law" to matters of governance. Hagelin is also the president of the David Lynch Foundation, that promotes TM as a remedy for "trauma and toxic stress among at-risk populations.".

== Early life and education ==
Hagelin was born in Pittsburgh, Pennsylvania, the second of four sons, to Mary Lee Hagelin (née Stephenson), a schoolteacher, and Carl William Hagelin, a businessman. He was raised in Connecticut and won a scholarship to the Taft School for boys in Watertown. In July 1970, while at Taft, he was involved in a motorcycle crash that led to a long stay—in a body cast—in the school infirmary. During his time there, he began reading about quantum mechanics but was also introduced to TM by a practitioner, Rick Archer, who had been invited to the school to talk about the meditation form, TM.

After Taft, Hagelin attended Dartmouth College. At the end of his freshman year, he studied TM in Vittel, France, and returned as a qualified TM teacher. In 1975, he obtained his A.B. in physics with highest honors (summa cum laude) from Dartmouth. He went on to study physics at Harvard University under Howard Georgi, earning a master's degree in 1976 and a Ph.D. in 1981. By the time he had received his Ph.D., he had published several papers on particle theory.

== Career ==
=== Academic positions ===
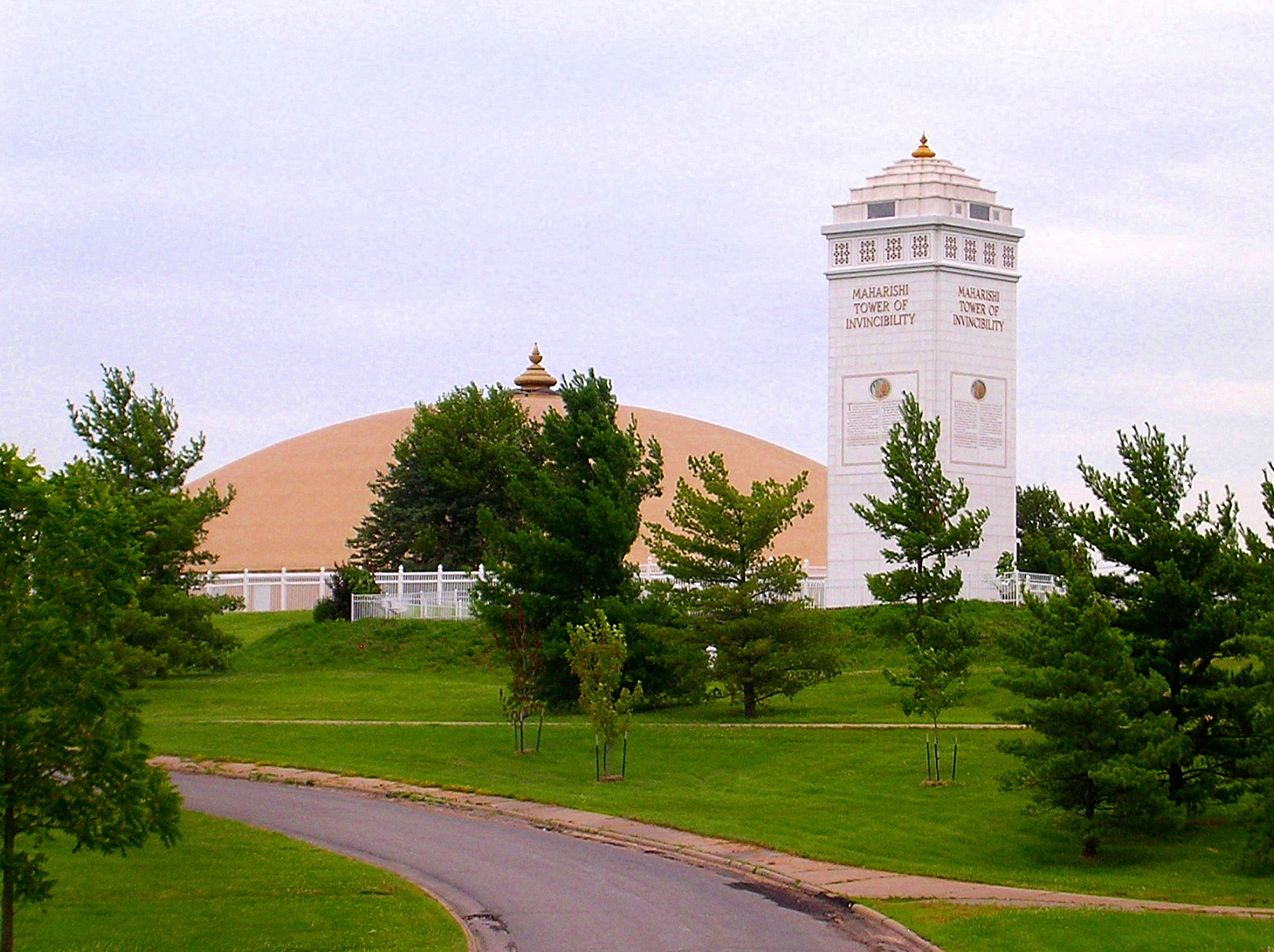
Part of Maharishi International University

In 1981, Hagelin became a postdoctoral researcher at the European Center for Particle Physics (CERN) in Switzerland, and in 1982, he moved to SLAC in California. He left SLAC in 1983. A year later, he joined Maharishi International University (MIU) as chair of the physics department. Two of Hagelin's previous collaborators, Dimitri Nanopoulos and John Ellis, were uncomfortable with his move to MIU, but they continued to work with him. While at MIU, Hagelin received funding from the National Science Foundation.

Hagelin became a trustee of MUM and, in 2016, its president. It was intended that he become president of Maharishi Central University, which was under construction in Smith Center, Kansas, until early 2008, when, according to Hagelin, the project was put on hold while the TM organization dealt with the death of Maharishi Mahesh Yogi.

=== Kilby International Award ===
In 1992, Hagelin received a Kilby International Award from the North Dallas Chamber of Commerce "for his promising work in particle physics in the development of supersymmetric grand unified field theory". According to a member of the selection committee, Hagelin's nomination was proposed by another selection-committee member who was a fellow TM practitioner. Chris Anderson, in a 1992 Nature article about Hagelin's first presidential campaign, questioned the value of the award.

=== Theoretical physics ===
During his time at CERN, SLAC and MUM, Hagelin worked on supersymmetric extensions of the standard model and grand unification theories. His work on the flipped SU(5) heterotic superstring theory is considered one of the more successful unified field theories, or "theories of everything", and was highlighted in 1991 in a cover story in Discover magazine.

From 1979 to 1996, Hagelin published 73 papers about particle physics, electroweak unification, grand unification, supersymmetry and cosmology, most of them in academic scientific journals. He co-authored a 1983 paper in Physics Letters B, "Weak symmetry breaking by radiative corrections in broken supergravity", that became one of the 103 most-cited articles in the physical sciences in 1983 and 1984. In a 2012 interview in Science Watch, co-author Keith Olive said that his work for the 1984 study was one of the areas that had given him the greatest sense of accomplishment. A 1984 paper by Hagelin and John Ellis in Nuclear Physics B, "Supersymmetric relics from the big bang", had been cited over 500 times by 2007.

=== Maharishi effect ===
In the summer of 1993, Hagelin directed a project aimed at demonstrating what TM practitioners call the Maharishi effect, the purported ability of a large group to affect the behavior of others by practising TM. The TM movement believes that the square root of one percent of the population of a country meditating can bring about peace. However, critics point to a lack of credible supporting evidence.

Approximately 4,000 people from 82 countries gathered in Washington, DC, and practiced TM for six hours a day from June 7 to July 30. The meditation included "yogic flying", a technique taught through the TM-Sidhi program in which practitioners engage in a series of hops while seated in the lotus position. Hagelin claimed that there was a local reduction in crime due to this activity.

According to Hagelin, the analysis was examined by an "independent review board", although all members of the board were TM practitioners. Robert L. Park, research professor and former chair of the physics department at the University of Maryland, called the study a "clinic in data distortion". In 1994, a science satire magazine, Annals of Improbable Research, "awarded" Hagelin the Ig Nobel Prize for Peace, "for his experimental conclusion that 4,000 trained meditators caused an 18 percent decrease in violent crime in Washington, D.C."

In 1999, Hagelin held a press conference in Washington, D.C. to announce that the TM movement could end the Kosovo War with yogic flying. He suggested that NATO set up an elite corps of 7,000 yogic flyers at a cost of $33 million.

=== Enlightened Audio Designs Corporation ===
In 1990, Hagelin founded Enlightened Audio Designs Corporation (EAD) with Alastair Roxburgh. The company designed and manufactured high-end digital-to-analog converters. EAD was sold in 2001 to Alpha Digital Technologies in Oregon.

== Politics ==
=== Natural Law Party ===
Hagelin and 12 others founded the Natural Law Party in April 1992 in Fairfeld, based on the view that problems of governance could be solved more effectively by following "natural law", the organizing principle of the universe. The party platform included preventive health care, sustainable agriculture and renewable energy technologies. Hagelin favored abortion rights without public financing, campaign-finance law reform, more restrictive gun control, and a flat tax, with no tax for families earning less than $34,000 per year. He campaigned to eradicate PACs and soft money campaign contributions and advocated safety locks on guns, school vouchers, and efforts to prevent war in the Middle East by reducing "people's tension".

The party chose Hagelin and Mike Tompkins as its presidential and vice-presidential candidates in 1992 and 1996. Hagelin received 39,212 votes from 32 states in 1992 (and 23 percent of the vote in Jefferson County, where MIU is located), and 113,659 votes from 43 states in 1996 (21 percent in Jefferson County).

Hagelin ran for president again in 2000, nominated both by the NLP and by the Perot wing of the Reform Party, which disputed the nomination of Pat Buchanan. Hagelin's running mate was Nat Goldhaber. A dispute over the Reform Party's nomination generated legal action between the Hagelin and Buchanan campaigns. In September 2000, the Federal Election Commission ruled that Buchanan was the official candidate of the Reform Party and hence eligible to receive federal election funds. The Reform Party convention that nominated Hagelin was declared invalid. In spite of the ruling, Hagelin remained on several state ballots as the Reform Party nominee because of the independent nature of some state affiliates; he was also the national nominee of the Natural Law Party, and in New York was the Independence Party nominee. He received 83,714 votes from 39 states. During the 2004 primary elections, Hagelin endorsed Democratic candidate Dennis Kucinich, and in April that year the Executive Committee of the NLP dissolved the NLP as a national organization.

=== Institute of Science, Technology and Public Policy ===
Hagelin is the director of the Institute of Science, Technology and Public Policy (ISTPP), an MIU think tank. According to the ISTPP's website, he has met with members of Congress and officials at the Department of State and Department of Defense to discuss terrorism. In 1993, he helped draft a paragraph in Hillary Rodham Clinton's 10,000-page health care plan; according to Hagelin, his was the only paragraph that addressed preventive health care. In 1998, the ISTPP testified about germ-line technologies to the DNA Advisory Committee of the National Institutes of Health; Hagelin's report to the committee said that "recombinant DNA technology is inherently risky because of the high probability of unexpected side-effects".

=== Other organizations ===
Hagelin established the US Peace Government (USPG) in July 2003 as an affiliate of the Global Country of World Peace and served as the latter's minister of science and technology. According to USPG's website, the TM movement created US Peace Government and the Global Country of World Peace to promote evidence-based, sustainable problem-solving and governance policies that align with "natural law".

Maharishi Mahesh Yogi appointed Hagelin the "Raja of Invincible America" in November 2007. Hagelin organized the Invincible America Assembly in Fairfield in July 2006. The assembly comprised individuals practicing TM and TM-Sidhi techniques twice daily. Hagelin predicted that as the number of Yogic flyers increased towards 3500, "[p]eace and prosperity will reign [in America], and violence and conflict will subside completely". In July 2007, he said that the assembly was responsible for the Dow Jones Industrial Average reaching a record high of 14,022 and predicted that it would top 17,000 within a year.

Hagelin is also president of the Global Union of Scientists for Peace, an organization of scientists opposed to nuclear proliferation and war, and president of the David Lynch Foundation, which promotes TM.

== Criticism ==
Hagelin's former academic peers "ostracized him" for combining science with a "form of Hinduism that doesn't acknowledge its roots". Neuroscientist and meditation researcher David Vago states that all of Hagelin's Maharishi Effect studies are "correlation without causation" and Dennis Roark, former chairman of the physics department at MIU, derided Hagelin's research as "crackpot science".

=== Efforts to link consciousness to the unified field ===
In a 1992 news article for Nature about Hagelin's first presidential campaign, Chris Anderson wrote that Hagelin was "by all accounts a gifted scientist, well-known and respected by his colleagues", but that his effort to link the flipped SU(5) unified field theory to TM "infuriates his former collaborators", who feared it might taint their own work and requests for funding. John Ellis, then director of CERN's department of theoretical physics—who worked with Hagelin on SU(5)—reportedly asked Hagelin to stop comparing it to TM. Anderson wrote that two-page advertisements containing rows of partial differential equations had been appearing in the U.S. media, purporting to show how TM affected distant events. In his book, Not Even Wrong: The Failure of String Theory and The Search for Unity In Physical Law (2007), the physicist Peter Woit wrote that identification of a unified field of consciousness with a unified field of superstring theory was wishful thinking, and that "[v]irtually every theoretical physicist in the world rejects all of this as nonsense and the work of a crackpot".

Philosopher Evan Fales and sociologist Barry Markovsky remarked that, because no such phenomena have been validated, Hagelin's "far-fetched explanation lacks purpose". They went on to say that the parallels Hagelin highlighted rest on ambiguity, obscurity and vague analogy, supported by the construction of arbitrary similarities.

Hagelin was featured in the movies What the Bleep Do We Know!? (2004) and The Secret (2006). João Magueijo, professor of theoretical physics at Imperial College London, described What the Bleep Do We Know!? as "horrendously tedious", consisting of deliberate misrepresention of science and "ludicrous extrapolations".

== Personal life ==
Hagelin's first marriage, to Margaret Hagelin, ended in divorce. He married Kara Anastasio, the former vice-chair of the Natural Law Party of Ohio, in 2010.

== Selected works ==
- (1999) John S. Hagelin, et al. "Effects of Group Practice of the Transcendental Meditation Program on Preventing Violent Crime in Washington, D.C." Archived February 2, 2017, at the Wayback Machine, Social Indicators Research, 47(2), June, 153–201. doi:10.1023/A:1006978911496
- (1998) John S. Hagelin. Manual for a Perfect Government: How to harness the laws of nature to bring maximum success to governmental administration, Fairfield: Maharishi University of Management Press.
- (1994) John S. Hagelin, S. Kelley, Toshiaki Tanaka. "Supersymmetric flavor-changing neutral currents: exact amplitudes and phenomenological analysis", Nuclear Physics B, 415(2), 7 March, 293–331.
- (1993) Lawrence Connors, Ashley J. Deans, and John S. Hagelin. "Supersymmetry mechanism for naturally small density perturbations and baryogenesis Archived March 9, 2021, at the Wayback Machine, Physical Review Letters D, 71, 27 December, 4291.
- (1992) Alon E. Faraggi, John S. Hagelin, et al. "Sparticle spectroscopy" Archived March 8, 2021, at the Wayback Machine, Physical Review D, 45(9), 1 May, 3272.
- (1990) John S. Hagelin, Stephen Kelley. "Sparticle masses as a probe of GUT physics", Nuclear Physics B, 342(1), 24 September, 95–107.
- (1989) John S. Hagelin. "Restructuring Physics from its Foundation in Light of Maharishi's Vedic Science" Archived May 5, 2017, at the Wayback Machine, Modern Science and Vedic Science, 3(1), 3–72.
- (1988) I. Antoniadis, John Ellis, J. S. Hagelin, D. V. Nanopoulos. "GUT model-building with fermionic four-dimensional strings", Physics Letters B, 205(4), 5 May, 459–465.
- (1987) John S. Hagelin. "Is Consciousness the Unified Field? A Field Theorist's Perspective" Archived August 30, 2017, at the Wayback Machine, Modern Science and Vedic Science, 1, 29–87.
- (1986) John S. Hagelin, Gordon L. Kane. "Cosmic ray antimatter from supersymmetric dark matter" Archived November 3, 2017, at the Wayback Machine, Nuclear Physics B, 263(2), 20 January, 399–412.
- (1985) John Ellis, John S. Hagelin. "Cosmological constraints on supergravity models" Archived November 3, 2017, at the Wayback Machine, Physics Letters B, 159(1), 12 September, 26–31.
- (1984) John Ellis, John S. Hagelin, et al. "Search for violations of quantum mechanics" Archived July 12, 2015, at the Wayback Machine, Nuclear Physics B, 241(2), 23 July, 381–405.
- (1984) John Ellis, J. S. Hagelin. "Supersymmetric relics from the big bang" Archived September 1, 2012, at the Wayback Machine, Nuclear Physics B, 238(2), 11 June, 453–476.
- (1983) John Ellis, John S. Hagelin. "Weak symmetry breaking by radiative corrections in broken supergravity", Physics Letters B, 125(4), 2 June, 275–281.
- (1982) John Ellis, John Hagelin, D. V. Nanopoulos. "Spin-zero leptons and the anomalous magnetic moment of the muon", Physics Letters B, 116(4), 14 October, 283–286.
- (1981) John S. Hagelin. "Mass mixing and CP violation in the B0-B0 system", Nuclear Physics B, 193(1), 21 December, 123–149.
- (1981) Sally Dawson, John S. Hagelin, Lawrence Hall. "Radiative corrections to sin2θW to leading logarithm in the W-boson mass" Archived March 9, 2021, at the Wayback Machine, Physical Review D, 23, 1 June, 2666.
- (1979) John S. Hagelin. "Weak mass mixing, CP violation, and the decay of b-quark mesons" Archived March 9, 2021, at the Wayback Machine, Physical Review D, 20(11), 2893, 1 December.

== See also ==
- List of Ig Nobel Prize winners
