= Marcy House =

Marcy House may refer to:

- Mrs. R. Marcy House, Southbridge, Massachusetts, listed on the National Register of Historic Places (NRHP)
- Marcy Houses, public housing complex operated by the New York City Housing Authority and located in the Bedford-Stuyvesant neighborhood, New York City
- Bradley H. Marcy House, also known as Cobblestone House, Eau Claire, Wisconsin, NRHP-listed
