= Napoleon LaRochelle Two-Family House =

Historic house in Massachusetts, United States

- U.S. National Register of Historic Places
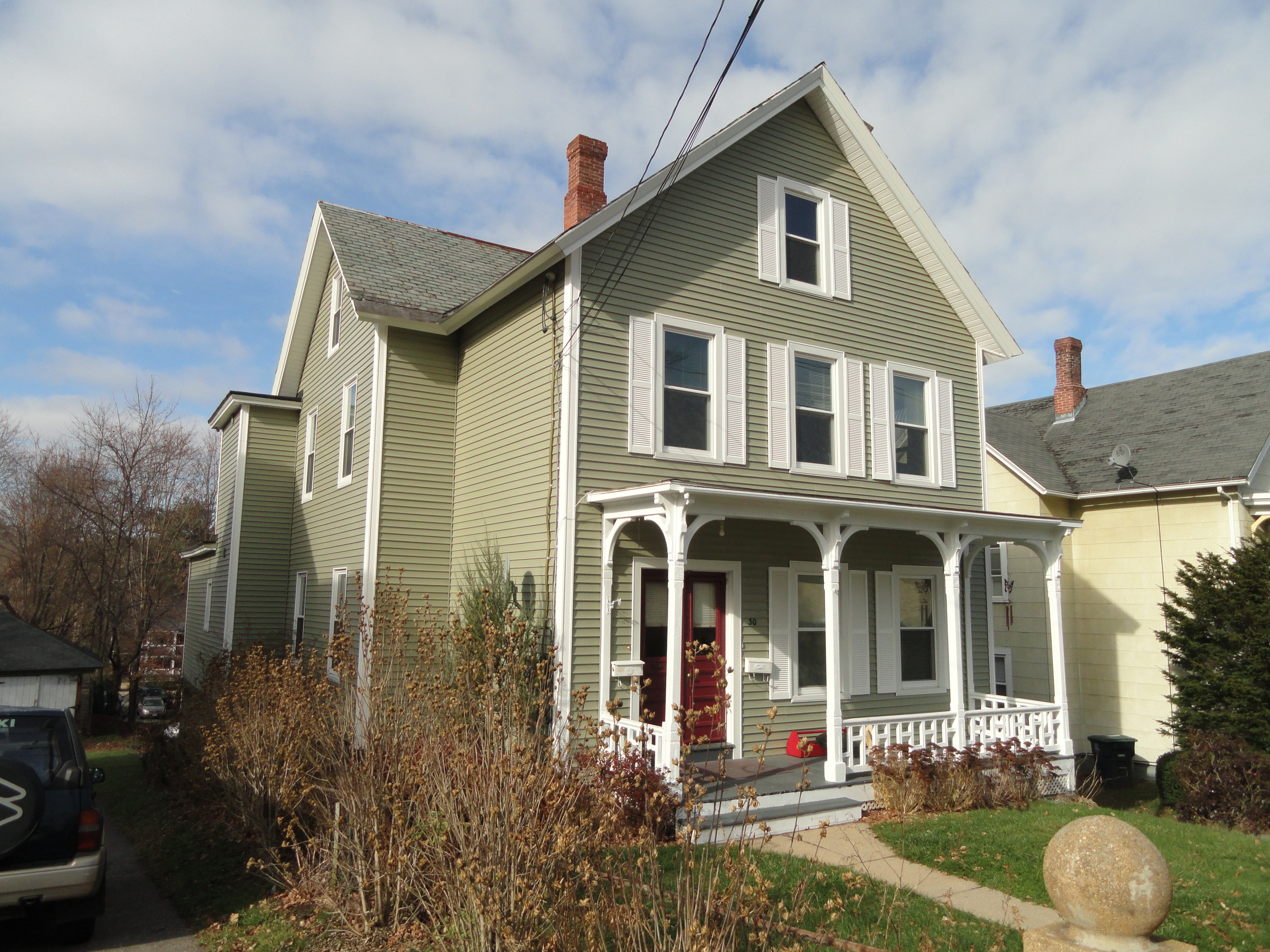

- Location within Massachusetts Location within the United States
- Location: 30 Pine St., Southbridge, Massachusetts
- Coordinates: 42°4′51″N 72°3′0″W
- Built: 1890
- Architectural style: Late Victorian, Vernacular Victorian
- MPS: Southbridge MRA
- NRHP reference No.: 89000567
- Added to NRHP: June 22, 1989

The Napoleon LaRochelle Two-Family House is a historic house at 30 Pine Street in Southbridge, Massachusetts. An excellent example of a vernacular Victorian duplex, it was probably built around 1890 for Napoleon LaRochelle, a polisher for the American Optical Company. He owned this and another house next door which was built in the same style. Its plan is a typical front-gable side entry layout, this time with a central cross gable. It has some bargeboard decoration on the front gable, and its front porch features a basket-weave railing.

It was built in 1890 and added to the National Register of Historic Places in 1989.

== See also ==
- National Register of Historic Places listings in Southbridge, Massachusetts
- National Register of Historic Places listings in Worcester County, Massachusetts
