= J.M. Cheney Rental House =

Historic house in Massachusetts, United States

- J. M. Cheney Rental House
- U.S. National Register of Historic Places
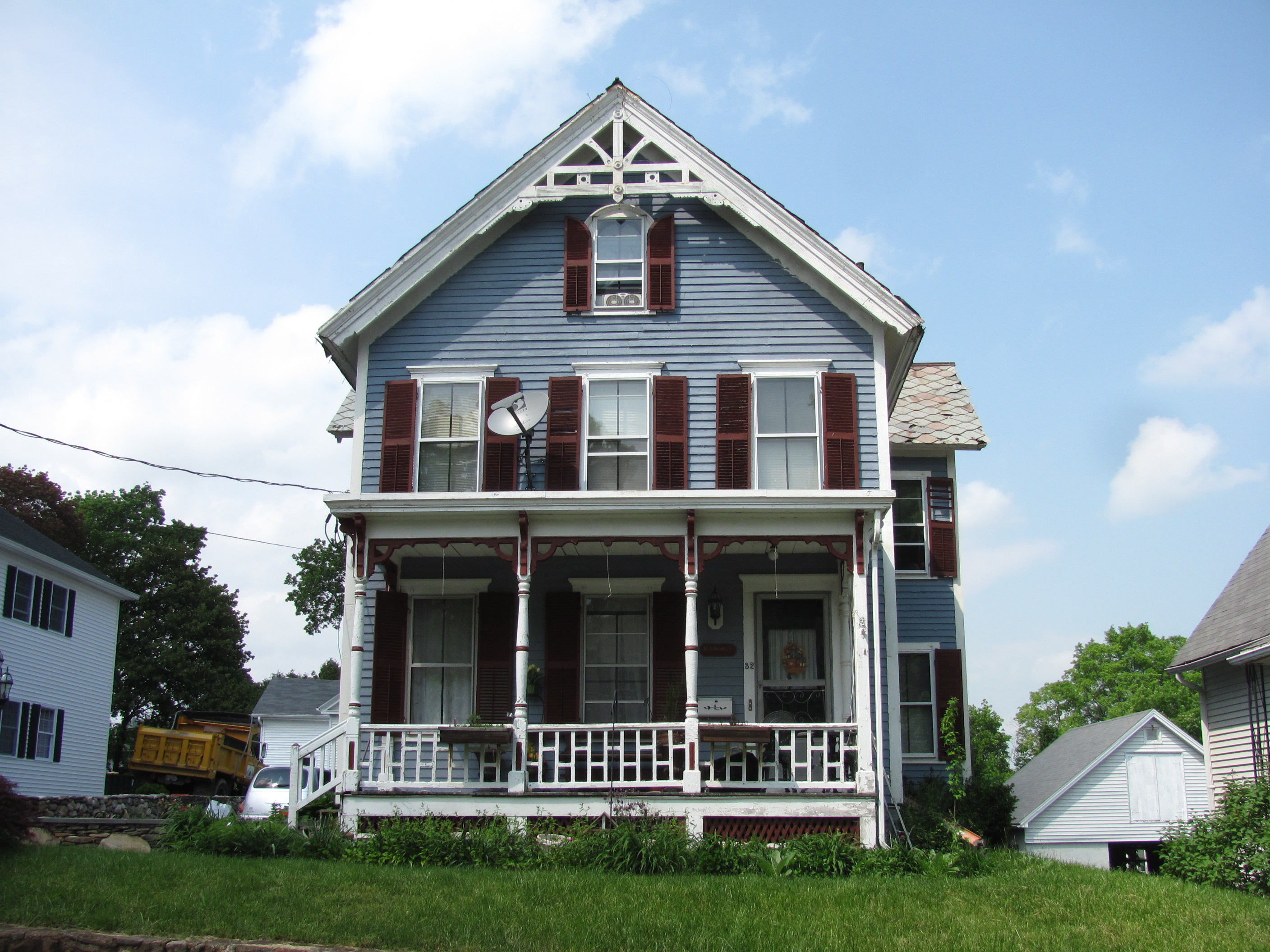

- Location within Massachusetts Location within the United States
- Location: 32 Edwards St., Southbridge, Massachusetts
- Coordinates: 42°4′44″N 72°2′10″W
- Area: less than one acre
- Architectural style: Late Victorian, Vernacular Victorian
- MPS: Southbridge MRA
- NRHP reference No.: 89000564
- Added to NRHP: June 22, 1989

The J. M. Cheney Rental House is a historic house at 32 Edwards Street in Southbridge, Massachusetts. It is a well-preserved vernacular Victorian house exhibiting details in a number of different styles. It was built in the late 19th century, during a second phase of construction in the Hamilton Street area that replaced larger properties of wealthier owners with smaller, more densely site, middle-class housing. This house was built for J. M. Cheney, treasurer of the Litchfield Shuttle Company, who owned several properties in the area, including the adjacent Kinney House, and also lived nearby. There is no hard evidence the property was intended for use as a rental, but this seems likely.

The basic house layout, a three-wide side-hall plan, was typical of the period, but the house's ornamentation is not. The window caps and the rounded gable window are Italianate in styling, but there is also a steeply pointed Gothic-style gable dormer, and the gable ends are decorated with Stick style ornaments. The front porch exhibits both Italianate and Queen Anne styling, with turned posts, brackets, and a decorative rectangular patterned balustrade.

The house was listed on the National Register of Historic Places in 1989.

== See also ==
- National Register of Historic Places listings in Southbridge, Massachusetts
- National Register of Historic Places listings in Worcester County, Massachusetts
