= House at 59–63 Crystal Street =

Historic house in Massachusetts, United States

- U.S. National Register of Historic Places
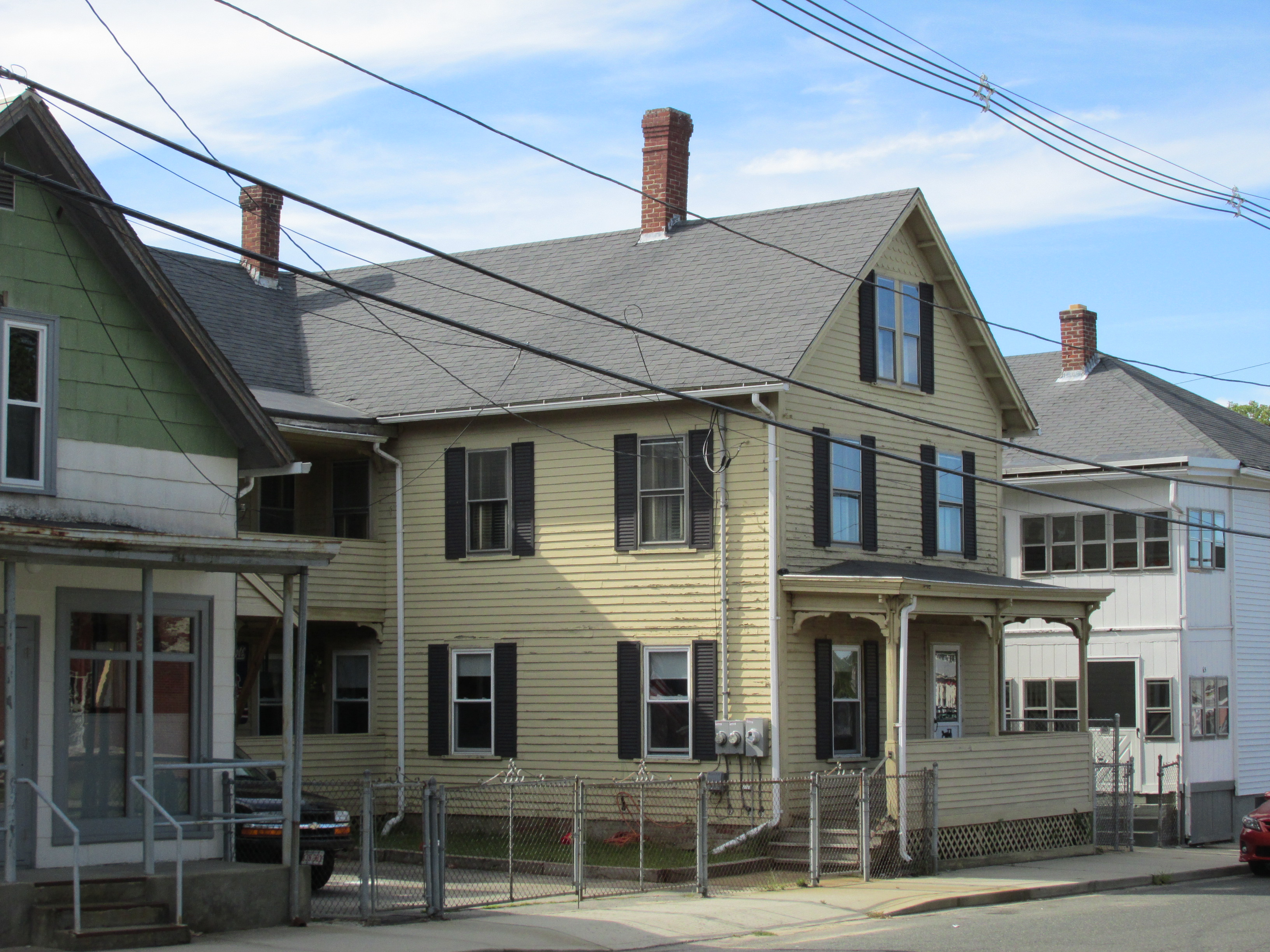

- Location within Massachusetts Location within the United States
- Location: 59–63 Crystal St., Southbridge, Massachusetts
- Coordinates: 42°4′29″N 72°1′40″W
- Built: 1899
- Architectural style: Colonial Revival, Italianate
- MPS: Southbridge MRA
- NRHP reference No.: 89000584
- Added to NRHP: June 22, 1989

The house at 59–63 Crystal Street in Southbridge, Massachusetts is a well-preserved multiunit residential structure built to provide worker housing for the American Optical Company around the turn of the 20th century. It is a 2.5-story wood-frame house, in a late Victorian style with both Italianate and Colonial Revival elements. Its side hall, gable front appearance is typical of many late 19th century houses in Southbridge.

The house was listed on the National Register of Historic Places in 1989.

== See also ==
- National Register of Historic Places listings in Southbridge, Massachusetts
- National Register of Historic Places listings in Worcester County, Massachusetts
