= H. Morse House =

Historic house in Massachusetts, United States

- U.S. National Register of Historic Places
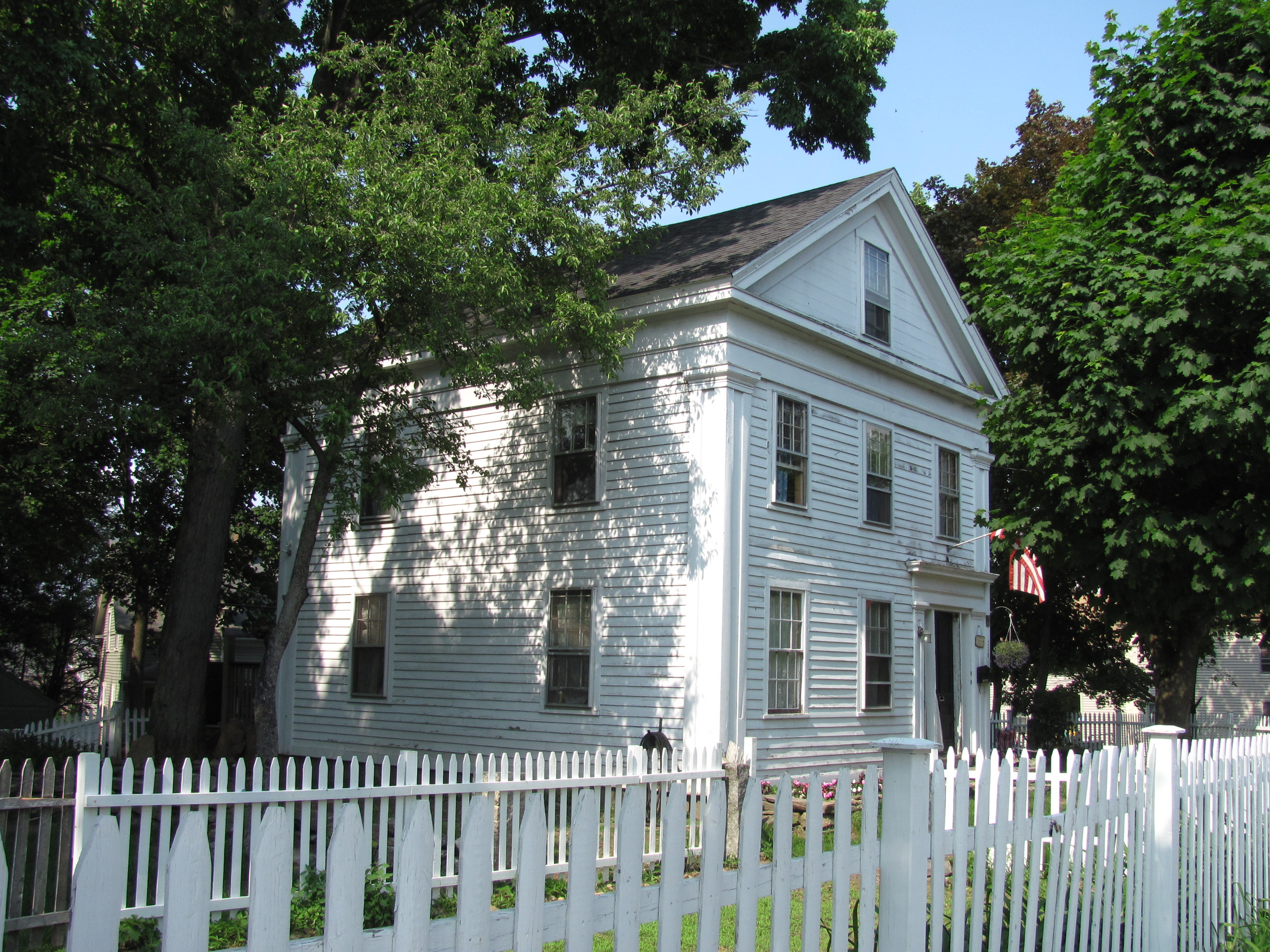
- H. Morse House

- Location within Massachusetts Location within the United States
- Location: 230 South St., Southbridge, Massachusetts
- Coordinates: 42°4′34″N 72°2′50″W
- Built: 1845
- Architectural style: Greek Revival
- MPS: Southbridge MRA
- NRHP reference No.: 89000538
- Added to NRHP: June 22, 1989

The H. Morse House is a historic house at 230 South Street in Southbridge, Massachusetts, United States. The 2½-story wood-frame house was probably built in the 1840s, and is a well-preserved example of a rural Greek Revival farmhouse. It was shown on an 1855 map as being owned by H. Morse, in the 1870s by Lyman Morse, and in 1878 by "Misses Morse". The house has some excellent Greek Revival features, including pilastered corner borders and an ornately decorated front door surround. A two-story addition was made to the side of the house in the 1870s, and another was made to the rear in the 20th century.

The house was listed on the National Register of Historic Places in 1989.

== See also ==
- National Register of Historic Places listings in Southbridge, Massachusetts
- National Register of Historic Places listings in Worcester County, Massachusetts
