= George Sumner House =

Historic house in Massachusetts, United States

- U.S. National Register of Historic Places
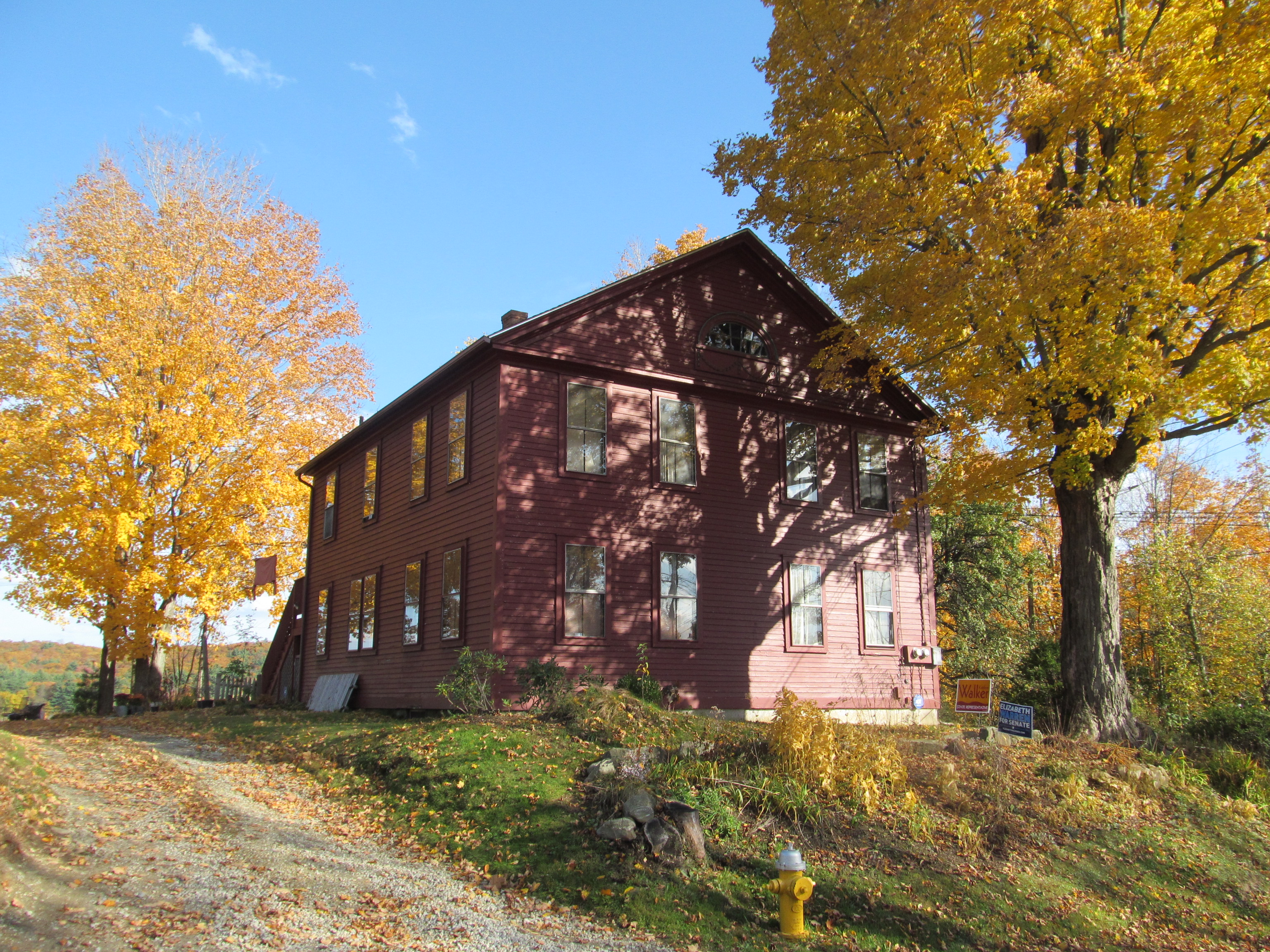
- 32 Paige Hill Road

- Location within Massachusetts Location within the United States
- Location: 32 Paige Hill Rd., Southbridge, Massachusetts
- Coordinates: 42°4′44″N 72°1′54″W
- Built: 1812
- Architectural style: Federal
- MPS: Southbridge MRA
- NRHP reference No.: 89000577
- Added to NRHP: June 22, 1989

The George Sumner House is a historic house at 32 Paige Hill Road in Southbridge, Massachusetts. The 2 1/2-story late Federal wood-frame house was built sometime before 1830, probably for Major George Sumner (who is recorded as its owner in 1855). Sumner was a leader in the early development of the textile industry in Southbridge, being the first in the area to offer as a service the complete cycle of woolen textile processing, although some work was still initially done in homes, not in a factory setting. The house is notable for the fanlight window on the gable end, which is a late 19th-century addition.

The house was listed on the National Register of Historic Places in 1989.

== See also ==
- National Register of Historic Places listings in Southbridge, Massachusetts
- National Register of Historic Places listings in Worcester County, Massachusetts
