= Dunbar-Vinton House =

Historic house in Massachusetts, United States

- U.S. National Register of Historic Places
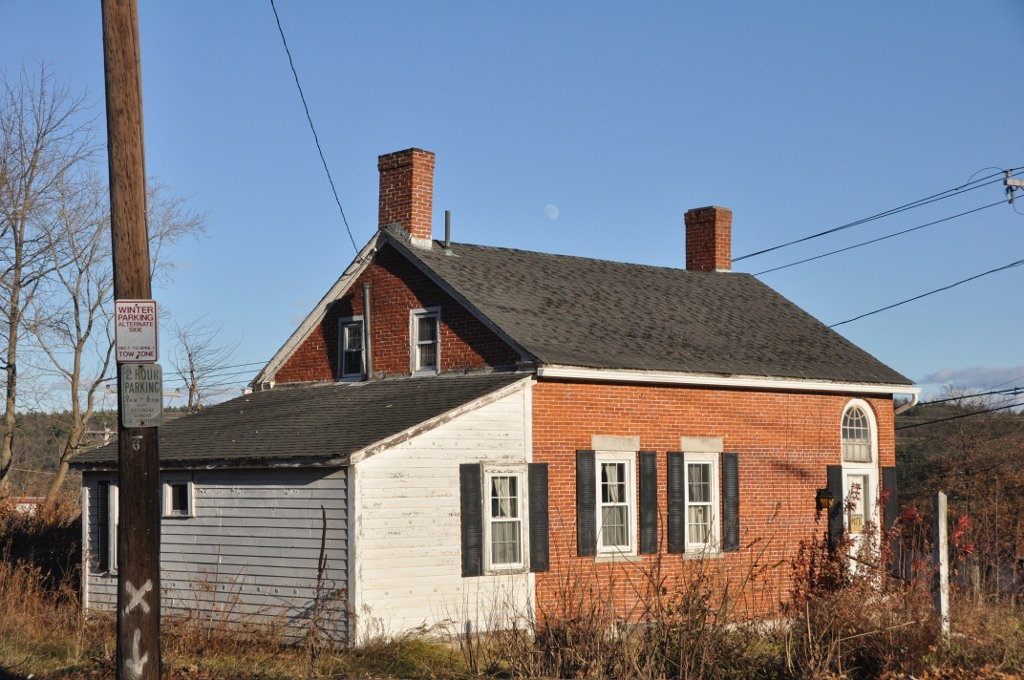

- Location within Massachusetts Location within the United States
- Location: Hook and Hamilton Sts., Southbridge, Massachusetts
- Coordinates: 42°4′38″N 72°2′3″W
- Area: less than one acre
- Built: c. 1828
- Architectural style: Federal
- MPS: Southbridge MRA
- NRHP reference No.: 89000573
- Added to NRHP: June 22, 1989

The Dunbar-Vinton House is a historic house at Hook and Hamilton Streets in Southbridge, Massachusetts, USA. Probably built in the early 19th century, it is locally unusual for its brick construction at that time, and may have been built as a district schoolhouse. It was listed on the National Register of Historic Places in 1989.

== Description and history ==
The Dunbar-Vinton House occupies a prominent site on the north side of downtown Southbridge, on the north side of the junction of Hook and Hamilton Streets. It is a 1 1/2-story brick building, with a gabled roof and two end chimneys. A wood-frame ell extends to the left side, covered by a shed roof and finished in wooden clapboards. The main facade has the entrance at the far right, topped by an elongated rounded window; there are two sash windows set in rectangular openings in the left half of the facade, with stone sills and lintels.

The date of this building's construction, and its original use, are both the subject of local speculation. The site was reported by 19th century historians to be the site of a school, but whether this building is the school in question or not is unclear. It structurally resembles a small schoolhouse, which lends credence to the theory. It is surmised to have been built by Captain Calvin Clemence, who died in 1828; the school was operated by a Mrs. Dunbar in the 1830s. In 1901, the house was reported to be occupied by Albert Vinton. The frame ell is a 20th-century addition, added in the 1970s.

== See also ==
- National Register of Historic Places listings in Southbridge, Massachusetts
- National Register of Historic Places listings in Worcester County, Massachusetts
