= H.C. Wells Double House =

Historic house in Massachusetts, United States

- H. C. Wells Double House
- U.S. National Register of Historic Places
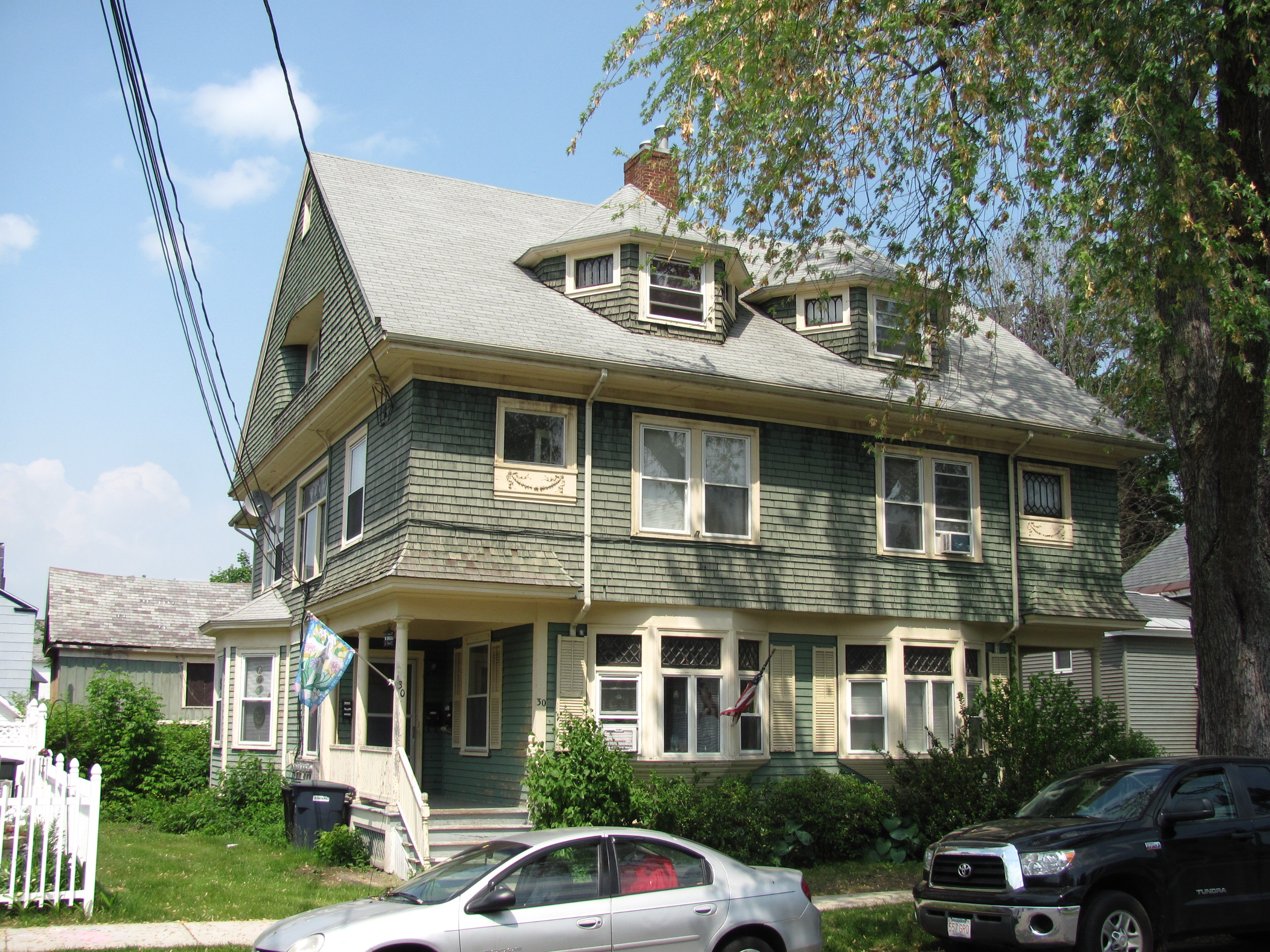
- H.C. Wells Double House

- Location within Massachusetts Location within the United States
- Location: 28-30 Dresser St., Southbridge, Massachusetts
- Coordinates: 42°4′26″N 72°2′10″W
- Built: 1888
- Architectural style: Queen Anne
- MPS: Southbridge MRA
- NRHP reference No.: 89000531
- Added to NRHP: June 22, 1989

The H. C. Wells Double House is a historic house at 28-30 Dresser Street in Southbridge, Massachusetts. The 2 1/2-story wood-frame duplex was built in the late 1880s or early 1890s by Hiram C. Wells, member of the Wells family which owned the locally important American Optical Company. It was one of several duplexes Wells built in the area as an income property. Although not as ornate as some Queen Anne houses, it features high quality construction methods despite a relatively simple symmetrical plan. It features a granite foundation, diamond transom windows, and stained glass windows.

The house was listed on the National Register of Historic Places in 1989.

== See also ==
- National Register of Historic Places listings in Southbridge, Massachusetts
- National Register of Historic Places listings in Worcester County, Massachusetts
