= House at 3 Dean Street =

Historic house in Massachusetts, United States

- U.S. National Register of Historic Places
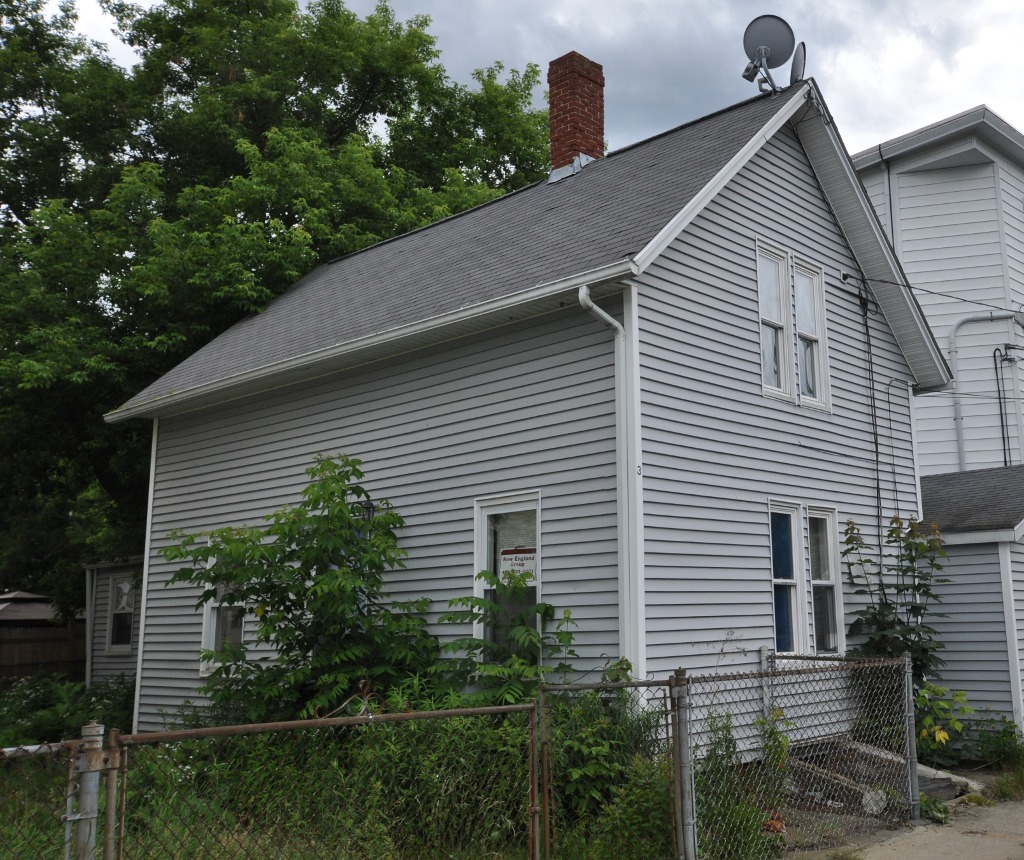

- Location within Massachusetts Location within the United States
- Location: 3 Dean St., Southbridge, Massachusetts
- Coordinates: 42°4′32″N 72°1′42″W
- Built: 1878
- Architectural style: Stick/Eastlake
- MPS: Southbridge MRA
- NRHP reference No.: 89000587
- Added to NRHP: June 22, 1989

The House at 3 Dean Street in Southbridge, Massachusetts is a rare well-preserved example of a worker housing cottage built by the locally important American Optical Company. It is a small 1 1/2-story house, three bays wide, presenting its side to the street. At the time of its listing on the National Register of Historic Places in 1989, it still had the original siding from its original construction, about 100 years earlier, which included cut shingles in the gable, and bracketed eaves. These details have since been lost or obscured by the application of modern siding (see photo).

== See also ==
- National Register of Historic Places listings in Southbridge, Massachusetts
- National Register of Historic Places listings in Worcester County, Massachusetts
