= Samuel C. Hartwell House =

Historic house in Massachusetts, United States

- U.S. National Register of Historic Places
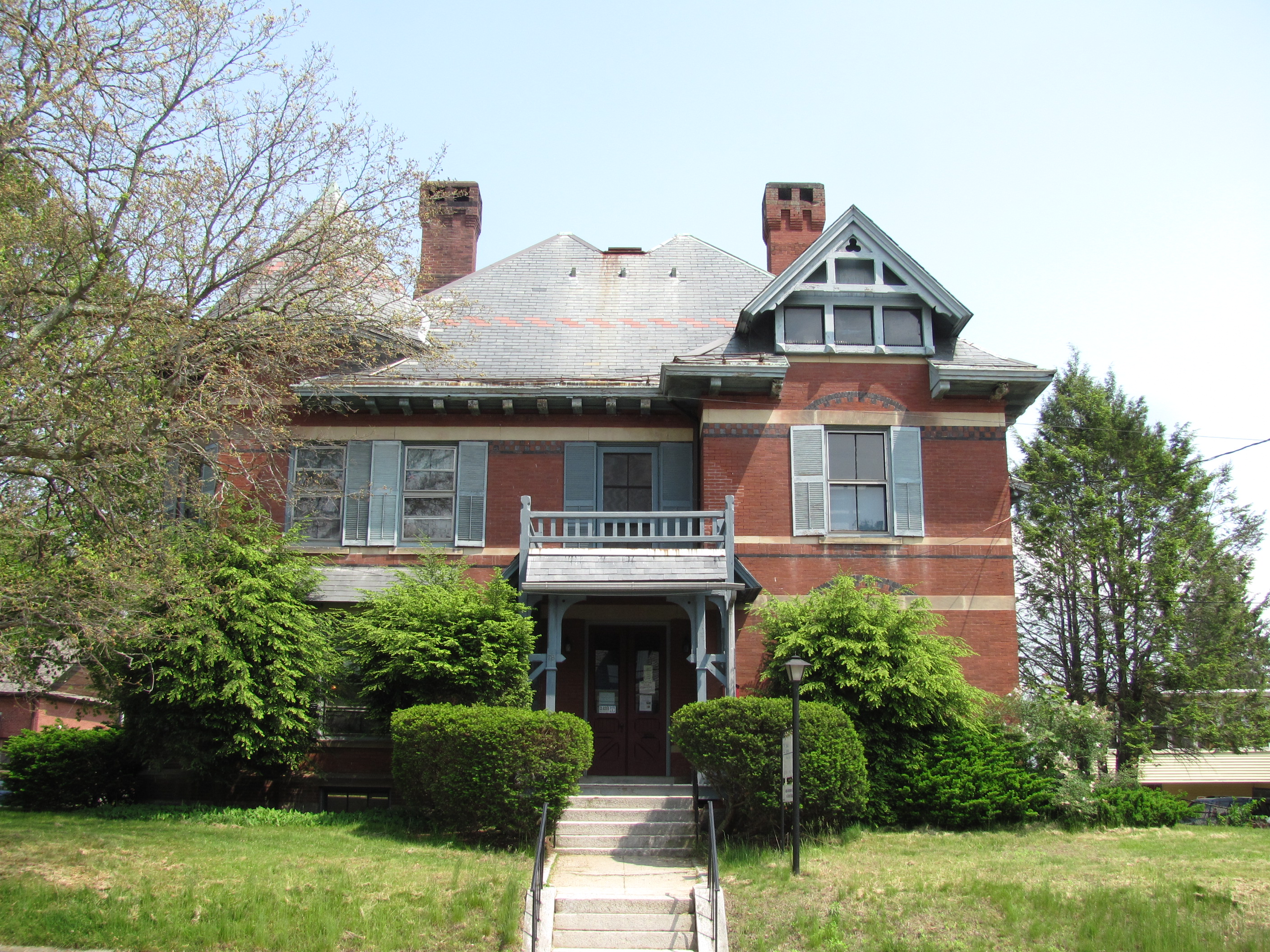
- Samuel C. Hartwell House

- Location within Massachusetts Location within the United States
- Location: 79 Elm St., Southbridge, Massachusetts
- Coordinates: 42°4′22″N 72°2′7″W
- Built: 1870
- Architectural style: Queen Anne
- MPS: Southbridge MRA
- NRHP reference No.: 89000592
- Added to NRHP: June 22, 1989

The Samuel C. Hartwell House is a historic house at 79 Elm Street in Southbridge, Massachusetts. It is an unusual example of an early Queen Anne Victorian house built of brick. It was constructed in the 1870s for Dr. Samuel Cyrus Hartwell, a prominent local doctor, and was built at a time when the Gothic Revival was more popular. It has decorated chimneys, and two turrets, which are signature elements of the Queen Anne style, along with contrasting stone courses and a multicolored slate roof.

The house was listed on the National Register of Historic Places in 1989.

== See also ==
- National Register of Historic Places listings in Southbridge, Massachusetts
- National Register of Historic Places listings in Worcester County, Massachusetts
