= Comins-Wall House =

Historic house in Massachusetts, United States

- U.S. National Register of Historic Places
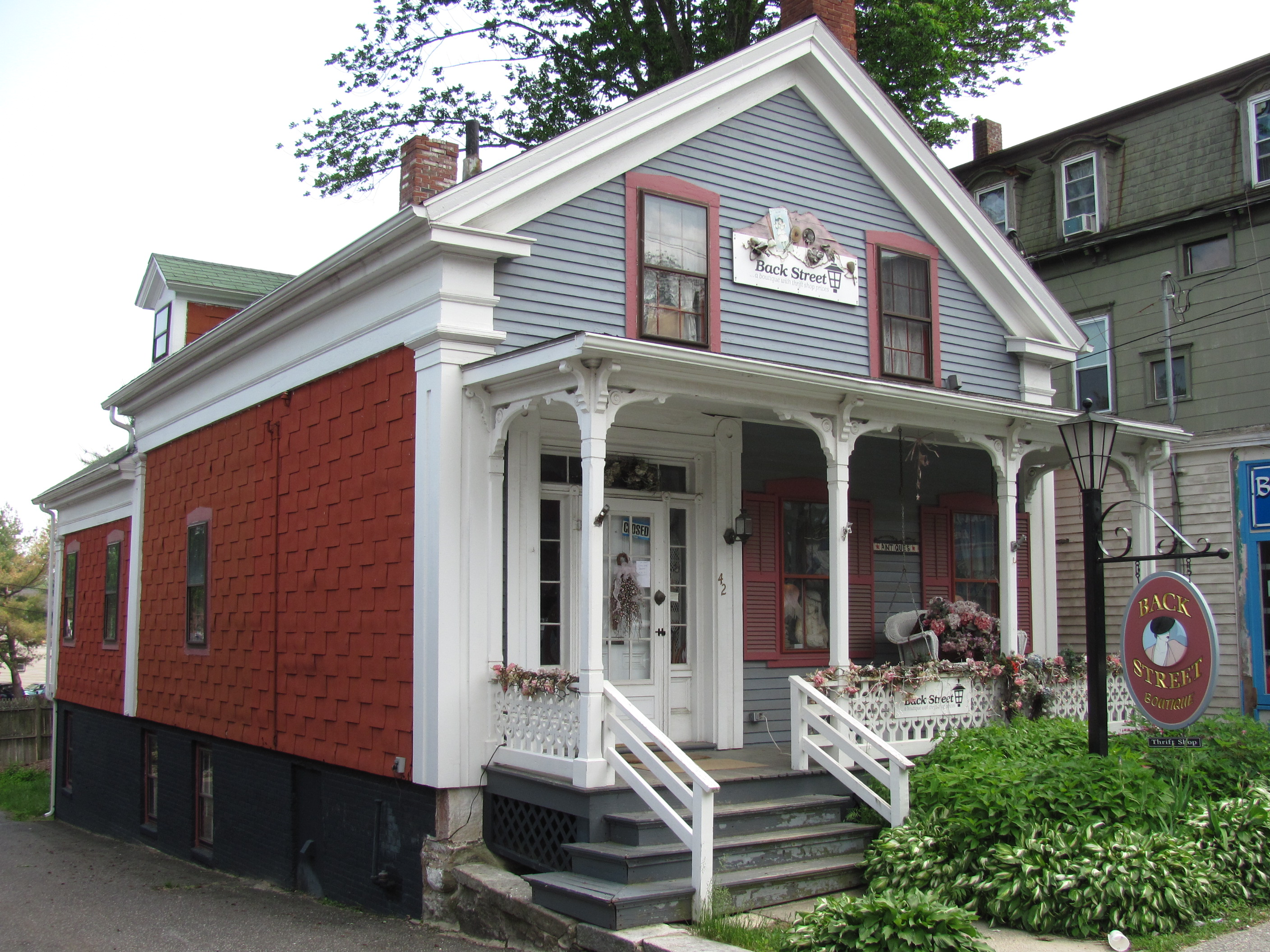
- Comins-Wall House

- Location within Massachusetts Location within the United States
- Location: 42 Hamilton St., Southbridge, Massachusetts
- Coordinates: 42°4′35″N 72°2′4″W
- Area: less than one acre
- Built: c. 1850
- Architectural style: Greek Revival
- MPS: Southbridge MRA
- NRHP reference No.: 89000555
- Added to NRHP: June 22, 1989

The Comins-Wall House is a historic house located at 42 Hamilton Street in Southbridge, Massachusetts. Built about 1850, it is a distinctive local example of a Greek Revival cottage with later Victorian embellishments. It was listed on the National Register of Historic Places on June 22, 1989.

== Description and history ==
The Comins-Wall House is located in Southbridge's central business district, on the east side of Hamilton Street near its junction with Hook Street. It is a 1 1/2-story wood-frame structure, with a gabled roof. Its front facade is finished in wooden clapboards, and the sides are covered in asphalt shingle siding. Its corners have pilasters, which rise to an entablature that runs along the sides. The front facade is three bays wide, with the entrance in the left bay and two sash windows to its right; another two sash windows are found in the gable above. The entrance is framed by sidelight and transom windows, slight recessed in an opening with flanked by slender paneled pilasters. A single-story porch extends across the front, with chamfered square posts rising to decorative jigsawn brackets.

The 1 1/2-story Greek Revival cottage is estimated to have been built in 1850, probably for a J. Comins, who was listed as its owner in 1855. The cottage, a fairly typical middle-class house of the period, is a rare survivor of a fire that swept the area in 1863. The front porch was probably added in the 1880s. This change may have been made by George F. Wall, a tailor and cloth dealer who owned it in the 1870s.

== See also ==
- National Register of Historic Places listings in Southbridge, Massachusetts
- National Register of Historic Places listings in Worcester County, Massachusetts
