= Eugene Tapin House =

Historic house in Massachusetts, United States

- U.S. National Register of Historic Places
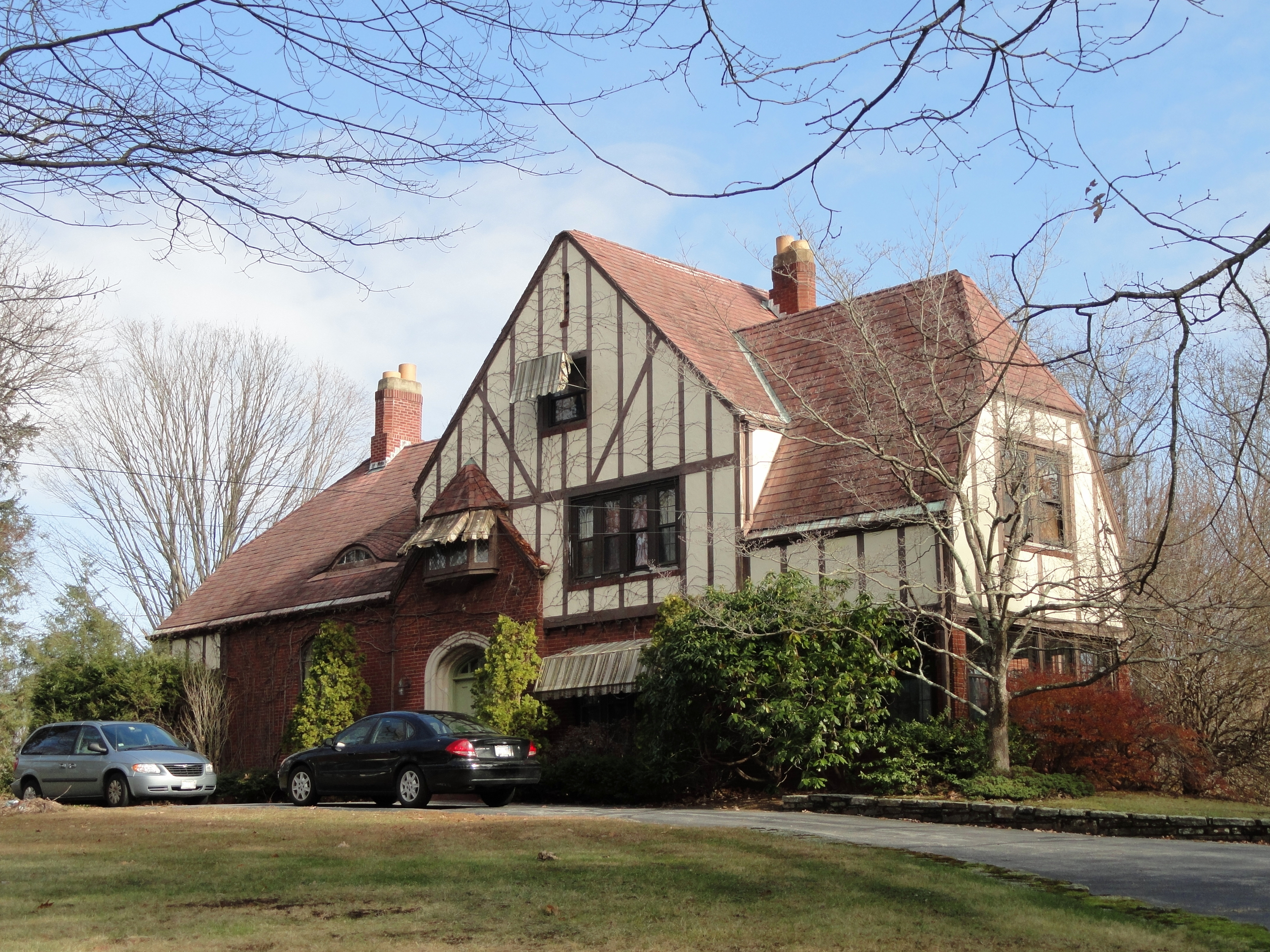

- Location within Massachusetts Location within the United States
- Location: 215 Lebanon Hill Rd., Southbridge, Massachusetts
- Coordinates: 42°3′21″N 72°2′15″W
- Built: 1929
- Architect: Laliberte, F.X. & Son
- Architectural style: Tudor Revival
- MPS: Southbridge MRA
- NRHP reference No.: 89000549
- Added to NRHP: June 22, 1989

Eugene Tapin House is a historic house at 215 Lebanon Hill Road in Southbridge, Massachusetts. The large Tudor Revival house was built in 1929, at a time when rural portions of Southbridge were gradually becoming suburbanized. It is one a few high style Tudor homes in the city. It was built by F.X. LaLiberte to a design by LaLiberte's son Oswald, for the latter's sister and her husband, Camille and Eugene Tapin. Camille worked in her father's business; Eugene was a music teacher and church organist. The house was listed on the National Register of Historic Places in 1989.

== See also ==
- National Register of Historic Places listings in Southbridge, Massachusetts
- National Register of Historic Places listings in Worcester County, Massachusetts
