= House at 34 Benefit Street =

Historic house in Massachusetts, United States

- U.S. National Register of Historic Places
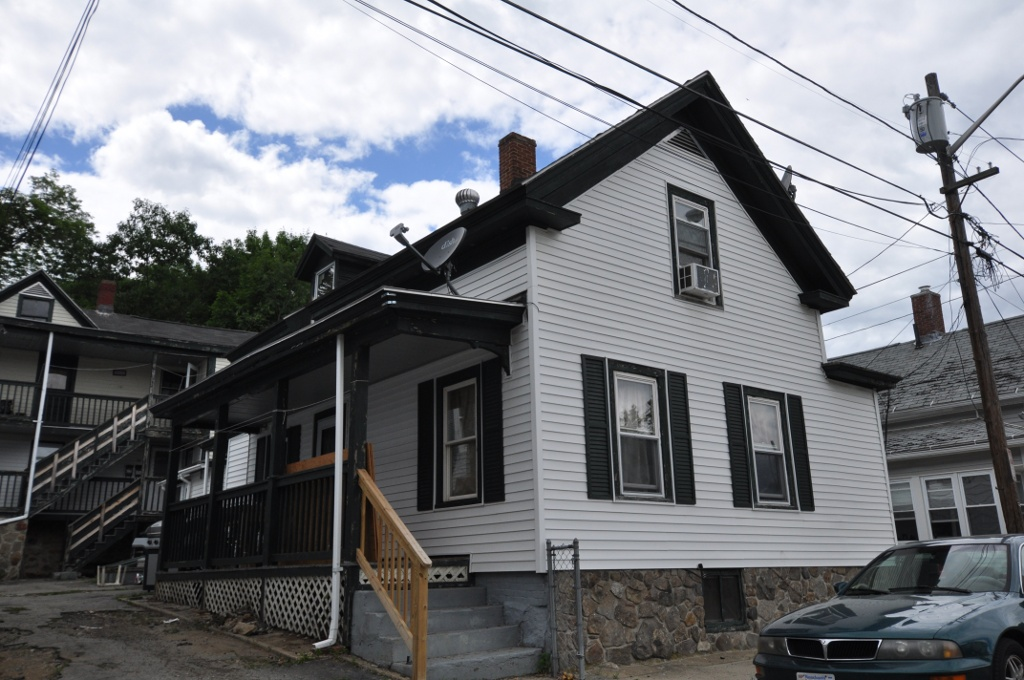

- Location within Massachusetts Location within the United States
- Location: 34 Benefit St., Southbridge, Massachusetts
- Coordinates: 42°4′31″N 72°1′46″W
- Built: 1870
- Architectural style: Greek Revival, Vernacular Greek Revival
- MPS: Southbridge MRA
- NRHP reference No.: 89000585
- Added to NRHP: June 22, 1989

The House at 34 Benefit Street in Southbridge, Massachusetts is a modest factory worker's cottage built by the American Optical Company during a period of its expansion in the 1870s. After opening its new Main Plant in The Flats section of Southbridge, workers began to migrate there from the Globe Village neighborhood, increasing demand for housing in that area. It is a narrow 1 1/2-story wood-frame structure, which has some architectural style despite its simplicity. The styling is basically Italianate in influence, with wide eaves, and a porch with decorative posts, balustrade, and brackets.

The house was listed on the National Register of Historic Places in 1989.

== See also ==
- National Register of Historic Places listings in Southbridge, Massachusetts
- National Register of Historic Places listings in Worcester County, Massachusetts
