= E. B. Cummings House =

Historic house in Massachusetts, United States

- U.S. National Register of Historic Places
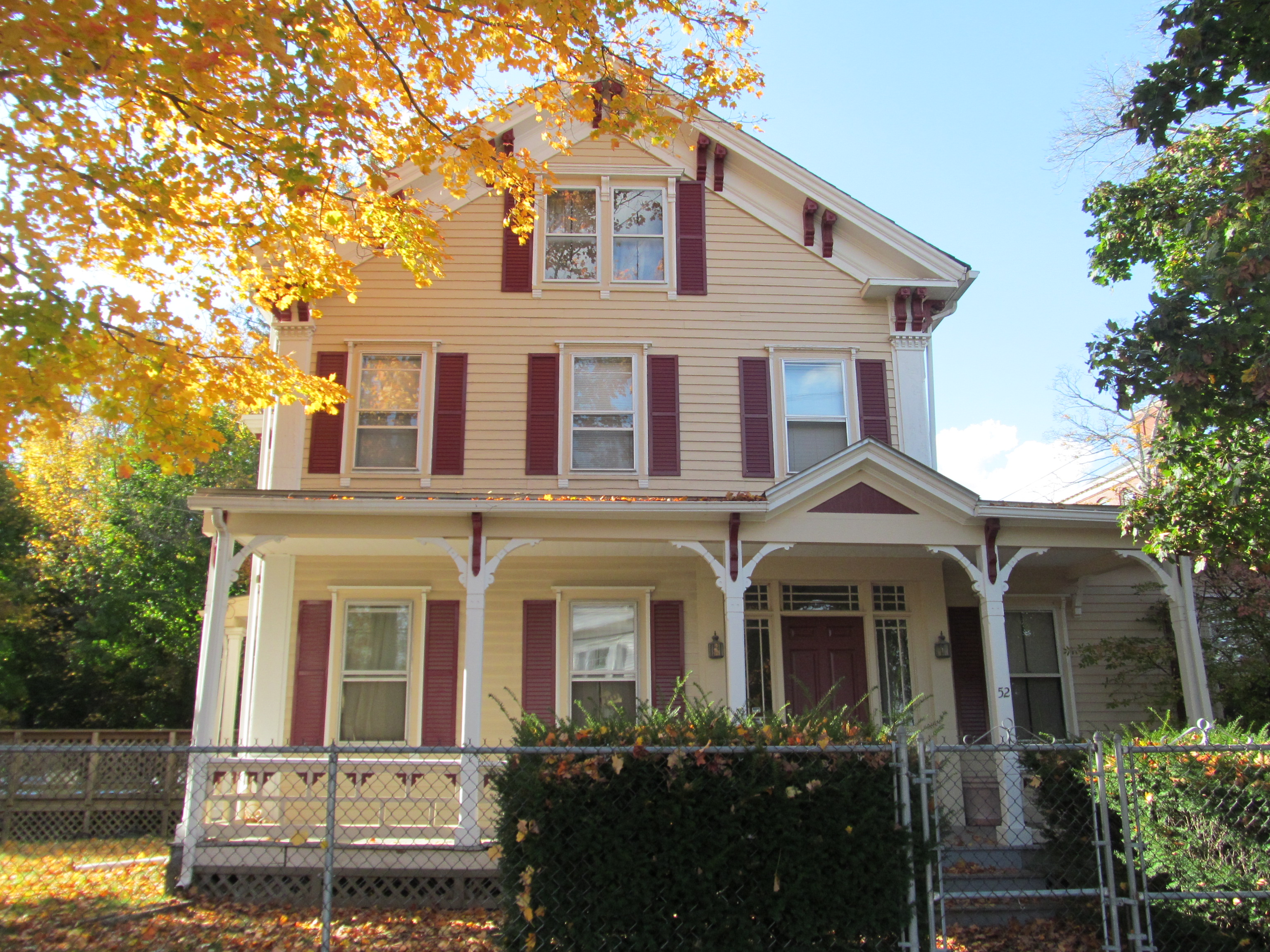
- 52 Marcy Street

- Location within Massachusetts Location within the United States
- Location: 52 Marcy St., Southbridge, Massachusetts
- Coordinates: 42°4′43″N 72°2′15″W
- Area: less than one acre
- Built: c. 1870
- Architectural style: Greek Revival, Italianate
- MPS: Southbridge MRA
- NRHP reference No.: 89000566
- Added to NRHP: June 22, 1989

The E. B. Cummings House is a historic house at 52 Marcy Street in Southbridge, Massachusetts. Built in the 1870s, it is an unusually late example of Greek Revival architecture with Italianate embellishments and later Victorian additions. The house was listed on the National Register of Historic Places on June 22, 1989.

== Description and history ==
The E.B. Cummings House is located in a residential area northwest of downtown Southbridge, at the southwest corner of Marcy and Edward Streets. It is the smallest but best preserved house of those at this corner, which was a fashionable residential area in the mid to late 19th century. The house is a 2 1/2-story wood-frame structure, with a gabled roof and clapboarded exterior. Despite a construction date well past the typical period for Greek Revival styling, the house has paneled corner pilasters, and sidelight and transom windows around the door, elements characteristic of that style. It also has Italianate details such as double brackets in the eaves, roof pitch, and front porch. A number of other elements, such as the second floor bay window, are later additions.

The house was built in the 1870s for Edwin B. Cummings, co-owner of a hardware store on Main Street. The neighborhood had been a desirable location for the city's business elite since the 1850s, and the neighbors were either prominent local businessmen or agents for the city's mills. The other houses at the corner, while of greater size and originally more stylish, have had their historic integrity compromised by the application of synthetic siding.

== See also ==
- National Register of Historic Places listings in Southbridge, Massachusetts
- National Register of Historic Places listings in Worcester County, Massachusetts
