= House at 18 Walnut Street =

Historic house in Massachusetts, United States

- U.S. National Register of Historic Places
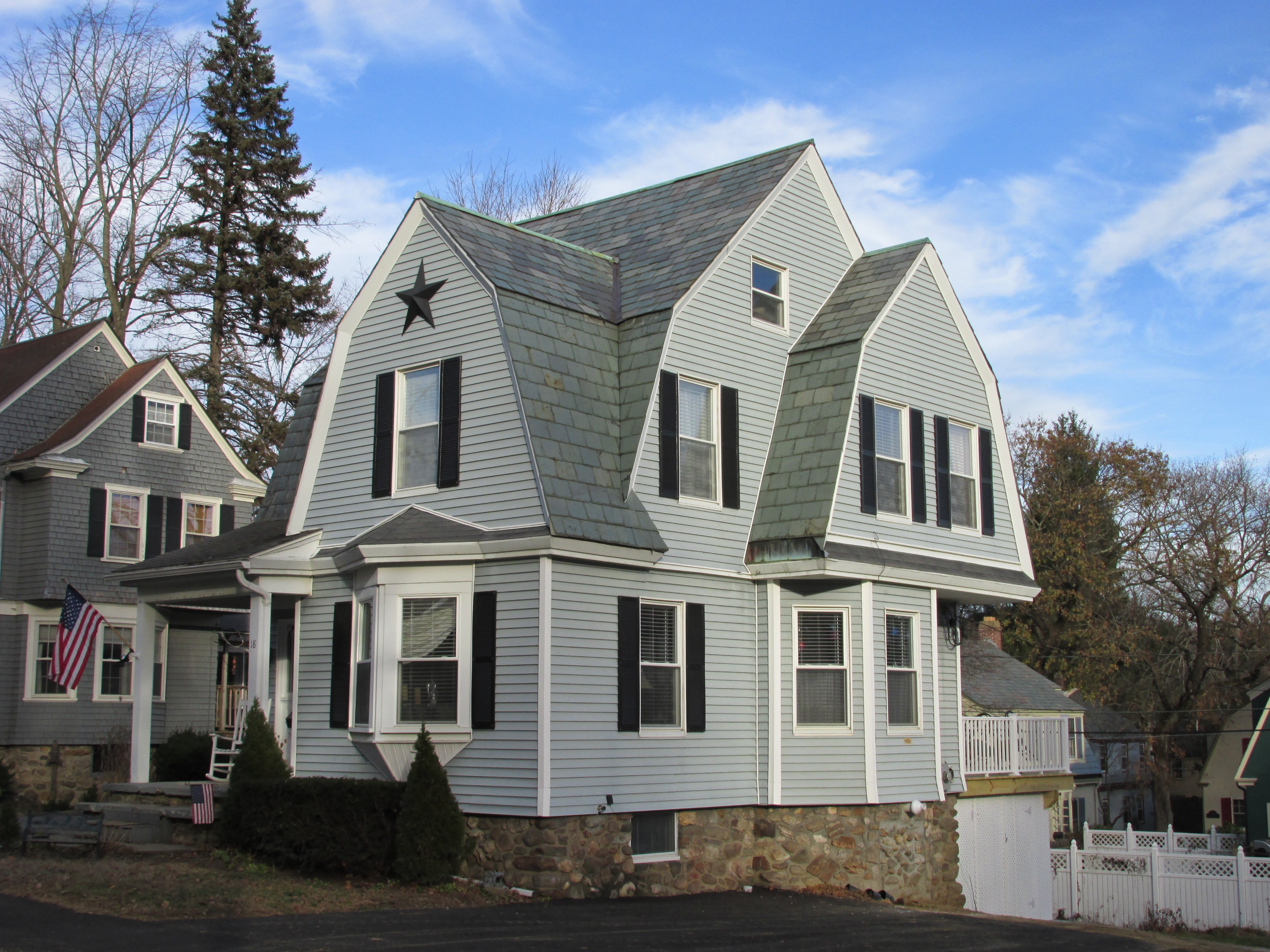
- 18 Walnut Street

- Location within Massachusetts Location within the United States
- Location: 18 Walnut St., Southbridge, Massachusetts
- Coordinates: 42°4′25″N 72°1′46″W
- Built: 1898
- Architectural style: Shingle Style
- MPS: Southbridge MRA
- NRHP reference No.: 89000580
- Added to NRHP: June 22, 1989

The House at 18 Walnut Street in Southbridge, Massachusetts is one of two modest yet remarkably high Shingle Style houses on Walnut Street in Southbridge, Massachusetts. It was built c. 1898 by George Wells, president of the locally important American Optical Company, apparently to provide worker housing for company employees. Of the two houses Wells had built, this one is the best preserved. It has a slate gambrel roof with projecting sections.

The house was listed on the National Register of Historic Places in 1989. Its original shingle siding has been replaced, as has the diamond-lighted bay window projecting from the front gable end.

== See also ==
- National Register of Historic Places listings in Southbridge, Massachusetts
- National Register of Historic Places listings in Worcester County, Massachusetts
