= Stephen Richard House =

Historic house in Massachusetts, United States

- U.S. National Register of Historic Places
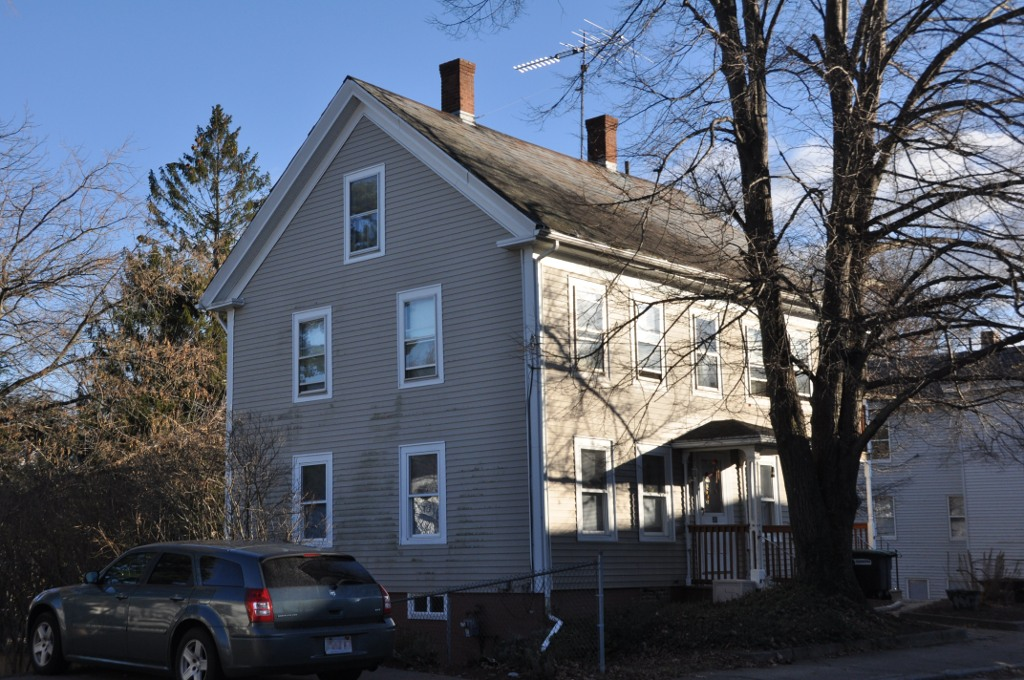

- Location within Massachusetts Location within the United States
- Location: 239-241 Elm St., Southbridge, Massachusetts
- Coordinates: 42°4′6″N 72°2′11″W
- Architectural style: Federal
- MPS: Southbridge MRA
- NRHP reference No.: 89000522
- Added to NRHP: June 22, 1989

The Stephen Richard House is a historic house at 239-241 Elm Street in Southbridge, Massachusetts. It is a 2 1/2-story wood-frame house with two interior chimneys and fairly basic vernacular Federal styling. Its date of construction is unknown: structures with commercial uses appear at its location on maps of the area dated 1855 and 1870. The house's unusual angle with respect to the street (unlike its later neighboring houses), suggests an earlier date of construction. It is first definitively identified on an 1879, owned by Stephen Richard. Richard was a French Canadian who immigrated to Southbridge and established a cutlery making firm in 1862. He is locally notable as the first French Canadian to become a United States citizen, something that he apparently needed to acquire a license of some sort. In his wake a significant number of other immigrants also became citizens.

The house was listed on the National Register of Historic Places in 1989.

== See also ==
- National Register of Historic Places listings in Southbridge, Massachusetts
- National Register of Historic Places listings in Worcester County, Massachusetts
