= Bacon–Morse Historic District =

Historic district in Massachusetts, United States

- U.S. National Register of Historic Places
- U.S. Historic district
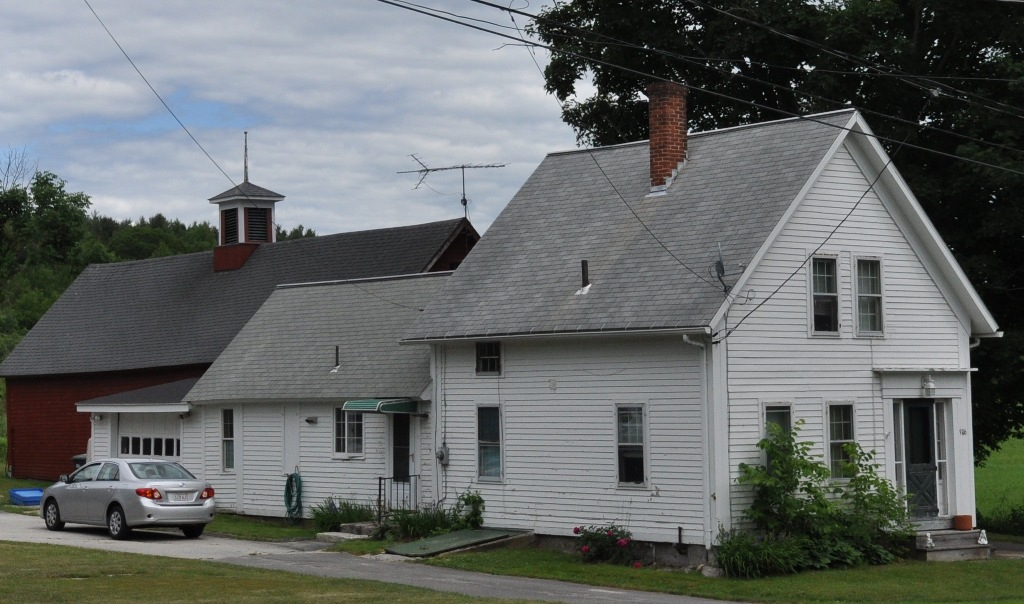
- SE corner of North Woodstock and Tipton Rock Roads

- Location within Massachusetts Location within the United States
- Location: North Woodstock and Tipton Rock Roads, Southbridge, Massachusetts
- Coordinates: 42°2′9″N 72°0′48″W
- Area: 100 acres (40 ha)
- Built: 1789
- Architectural style: Greek Revival, Federal
- MPS: Southbridge MRA
- NRHP reference No.: 89000602
- Added to NRHP: June 22, 1989

The Bacon–Morse Historic District encompasses a historic rural village center in Southbridge, Massachusetts. It consists of a collection of houses and barns, as well as a cemetery, at the intersection of North Woodstock and Tipton Rock Roads. Its name comes from the early settlers of the area, who included families named Morse and Bacon. The area once also included a tavern and a schoolhouse, but these were demolished some years ago."MACRIS inventory record for Bacon–Morse Historic District". Commonwealth of Massachusetts. The district was listed on the National Register of Historic Places in 1989

== Buildings ==
The most notable structure in the district is the c. 1750 Freeman-Pratt House, which is one of the best-preserved Federal style farmhouses in Southbridge. The oldest portion of the house is a 1-1/2 story five section that is now an ell on a two-story main structure. The house features a fanlight over the front door, with pilasters and sidelights surrounding the door. A barn from the 19th century also survives on the property.

In addition to the Freeman-Pratt House, there are 4 other houses in the district, two of which are Greek Revival, one is Late Victorian, and the last is a 1910 construction of unidentified style. The Morse Cemetery, formally established in 1789, is estimated to contain over 200 graves, many predating 1840.

== History ==
This area was settled in the mid-18th century by members of the Bacon, Morse, and Pratt families. By 1830, there was a cluster of six houses near the road intersection, along with a school, established about 1772. The area remained largely agricultural into the 20th century, acquiring as industry a lumber yard in the late 19th century.

== See also ==
- National Register of Historic Places listings in Southbridge, Massachusetts
- National Register of Historic Places listings in Worcester County, Massachusetts
