= Lorenzo R. Stone House =

Historic house in Massachusetts, United States

- U.S. National Register of Historic Places
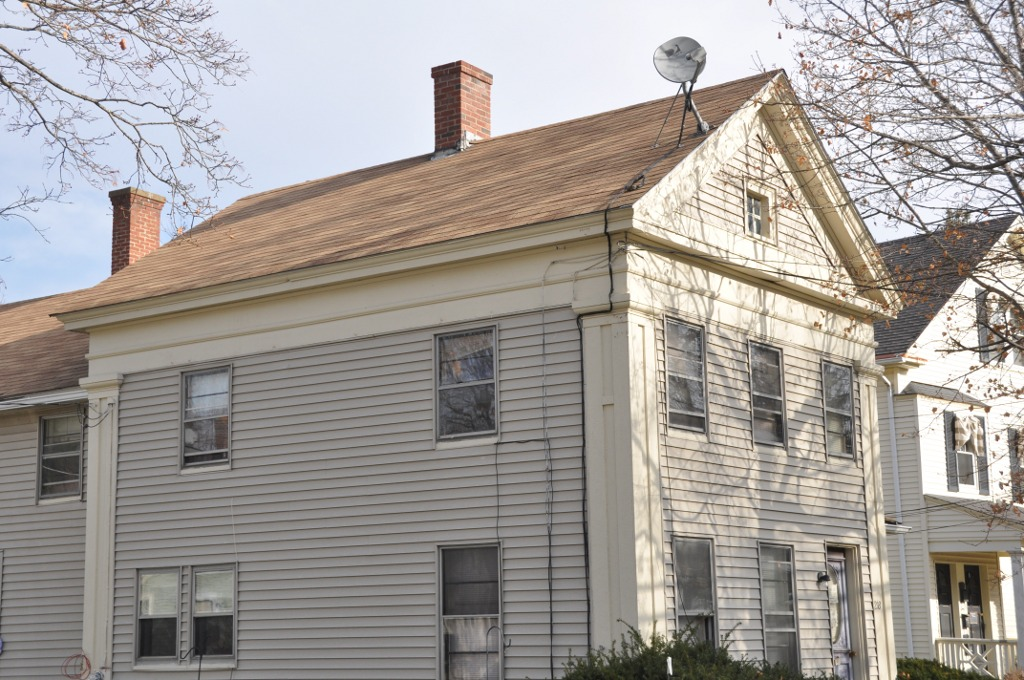

- Location within Massachusetts Location within the United States
- Location: 218 South St., Southbridge, Massachusetts
- Coordinates: 42°4′35″N 72°2′48″W
- Architectural style: Greek Revival
- MPS: Southbridge MRA
- NRHP reference No.: 89000537
- Added to NRHP: June 22, 1989

The Lorenzo R. Stone House is a historic house at 218 South Street in Southbridge, Massachusetts. It was built between 1830 and 1855 for Lorenzo Stone, occupation unknown. Other houses were built in this area during the same time period due to the expansion of the Globe Village area, and were occupied to middle class workers and supervisors of the Hamilton Woolen Company. This is a 2 1/2-story wood-frame house, with a simple three-bay side-hall configuration. The exterior features fine Greek Revival detailing, including corner pilasters and a pedimented gable with frieze trim. The house is not out of scale with the modest houses that surround it.

The house was listed on the National Register of Historic Places in 1989.

== See also ==
- National Register of Historic Places listings in Southbridge, Massachusetts
- National Register of Historic Places listings in Worcester County, Massachusetts
