= Dennison School House =

Historic house in Massachusetts, United States

- U.S. National Register of Historic Places
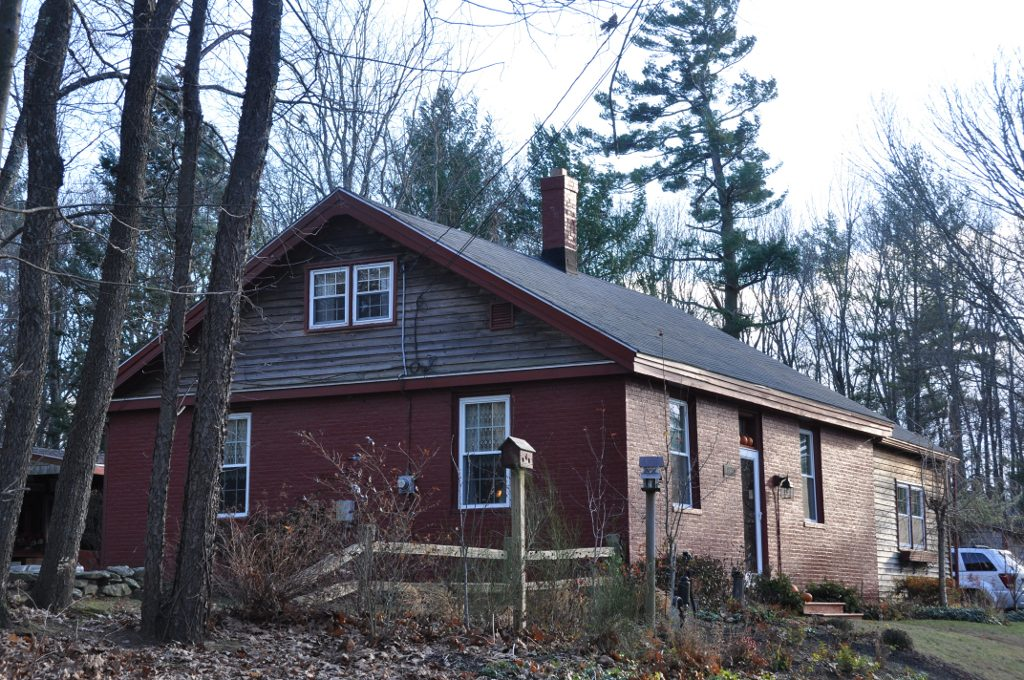

- Location within Massachusetts Location within the United States
- Location: Dennison Ln., Southbridge, Massachusetts
- Coordinates: 42°3′38″N 72°3′42″W
- Area: 1.7 acres (0.69 ha)
- Built: c. 1849
- Architectural style: Greek Revival
- MPS: Southbridge MRA
- NRHP reference No.: 89000551
- Added to NRHP: June 22, 1989

Dennison School House is a historic school building (now a private residence) at Dennison Lane in Southbridge, Massachusetts. Built about 1849, it is the city's only surviving rural district schoolhouse built in brick. The building was listed on the National Register of Historic Places in 1989.

== Description and history ==
The former Dennison School House is located in a rural setting of southwestern Southbridge, on the east side of Dennison Lane near its junction with Dennison Crossing. It is a modest 1 1/2-story brick structure, with a gabled roof. The main facade is three bays wide, with sash windows on either side of the entrance, which has a small transom window. A wood-frame ell extends to the right. The gable ends on the sides are framed in wood and finished in siding.

The building's location is believed to be the first place in Southbridge to be occupied by a school, because a school was documented to stand here in 1795, when the area was still part of Sturbridge. The present building is estimated to have been built in 1849, based on its modest Greek Revival design. It is unusual for the use of brick in its construction; the only other brick school from the period is the larger one in the city center. The building was probably originally built with its entrance at one of the gable ends, a typical placement for small schools. Only one other rural district school survives in the city; it is a heavily altered frame structure that has also been converted to residential use.

== See also ==
- National Register of Historic Places listings in Southbridge, Massachusetts
- National Register of Historic Places listings in Worcester County, Massachusetts
