= Central Mills Historic District =

Historic district in Massachusetts, United States

- U.S. National Register of Historic Places
- U.S. Historic district
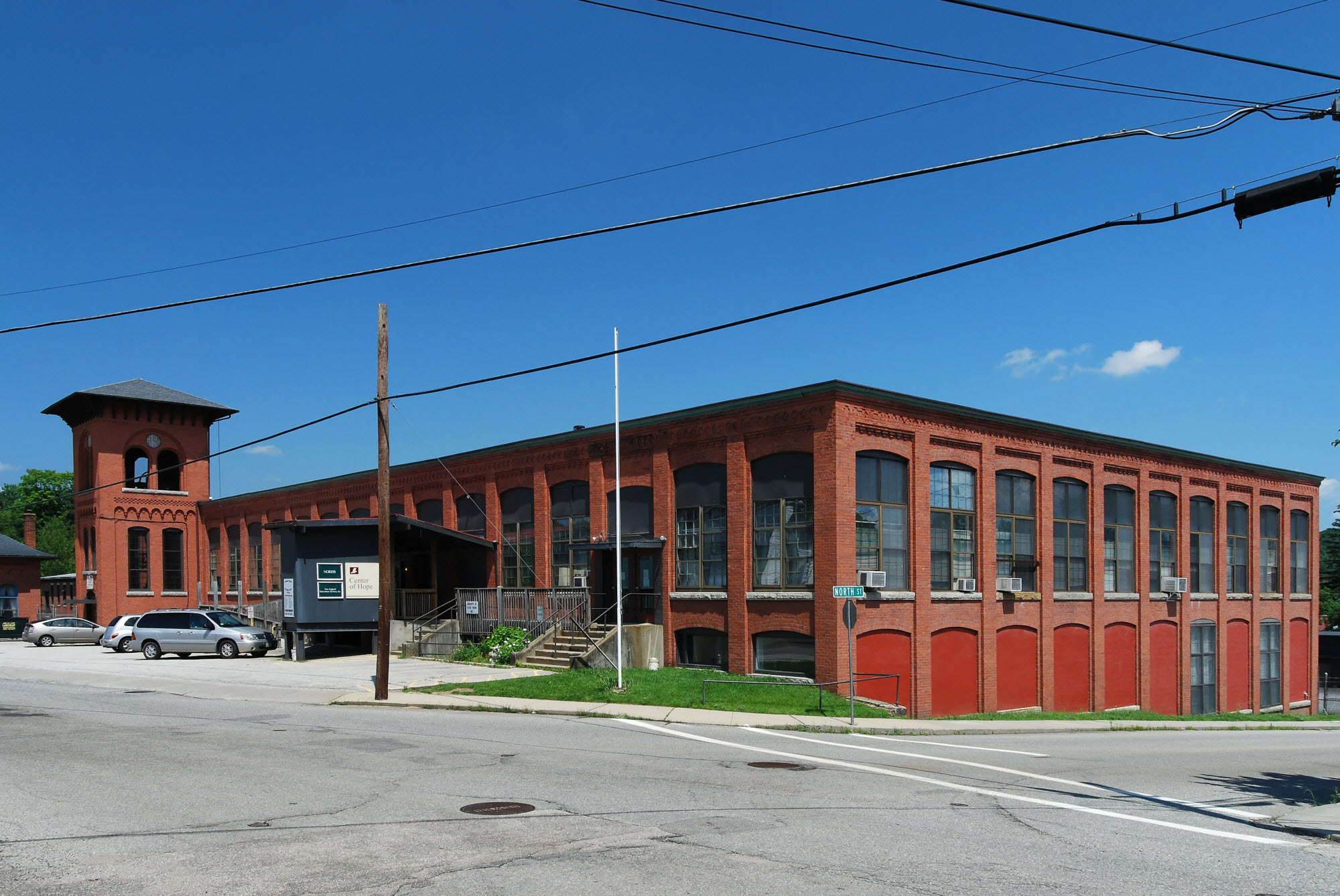

- Location within Massachusetts Location within the United States
- Location: Roughly bounded by Quinebaug River, North St., and Central St., Southbridge, Massachusetts
- Coordinates: 42°4′37″N 72°1′53″W
- Built: 1908
- Architectural style: Romanesque
- MPS: Southbridge MRA
- NRHP reference No.: 89000595
- Added to NRHP: June 22, 1989

The Central Mills Historic District encompasses a historic mill complex on the Quinebaug River in central Southbridge, Massachusetts. Located at the corner of Foster and North Streets, the site consists of three brick buildings, the oldest of which has portions dating to 1837. Despite being extensively rebuilt in the early 20th century, the complex has an appearance that is more typical of 19th century mills.

The Central Manufacturing Company was established in 1837, and was one of Southbridge's major employers well into the 20th century. The company built its premises on the site of Southbridge's earliest grist- and sawmills, and the town grew around the facility. By late in the 19th century most New England textile mills were in decline, due to increased competition in the South. However, Central Manufacturing embarked on a major renovation of its plant in 1908. It knocked a significant portion of the 1837 plant, and built the present two story brick structure, with the surviving 1837 section attached to its rear. The building is in the Romanesque Revival style, with rounded arch windows and a small tower.

In addition to the main factory building, there are two other buildings in the complex. One is a small single story office building, also built in 1908 and with Romanesque Revival styling. This building is on the same parcel as the main building. The third building is a more utilitarian brick warehouse, built 1915, which is located across North Street (but also fronting on Foster) from the main building.

The district was listed on the National Register of Historic Places in 1989.

== See also ==
- National Register of Historic Places listings in Southbridge, Massachusetts
- National Register of Historic Places listings in Worcester County, Massachusetts
