= William McKinstry Farmhouse =

Historic house in Massachusetts, United States

- U.S. National Register of Historic Places
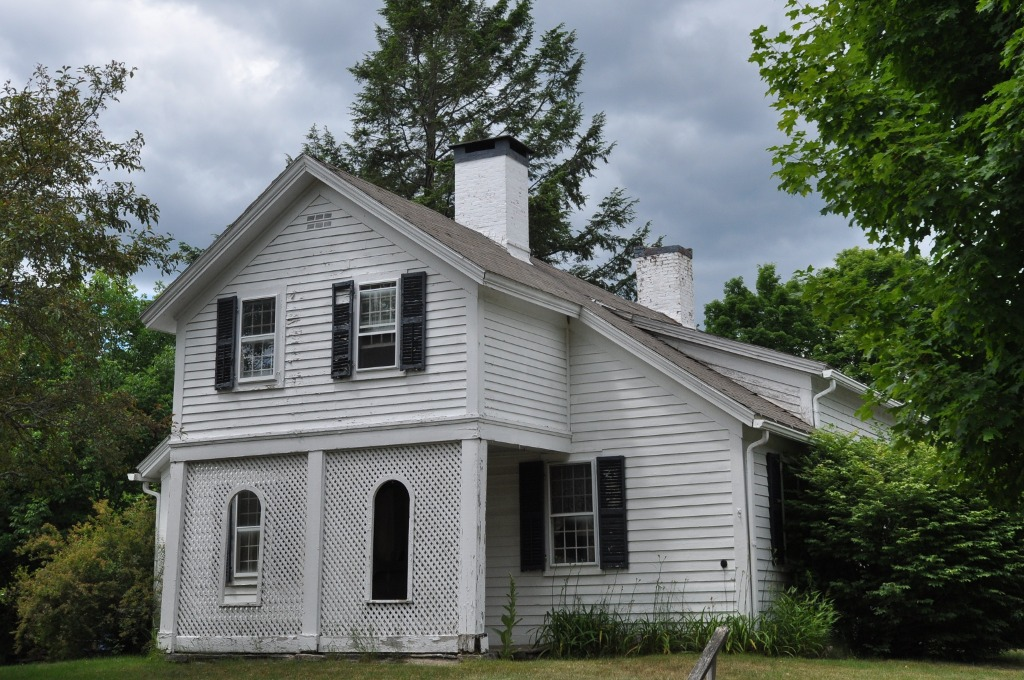

- Location within Massachusetts Location within the United States
- Location: 361 Pleasant St., Southbridge, Massachusetts
- Coordinates: 42°5′28″N 72°2′31″W
- Built: 1780
- Architectural style: Colonial Revival
- MPS: Southbridge MRA
- NRHP reference No.: 89000571
- Added to NRHP: June 22, 1989

The William McKinstry Farmhouse is a historic house at 361 Pleasant Street in Southbridge, Massachusetts. Despite significant later alteration, it is one of the oldest surviving farmhouses in Southbridge. It was built in about 1780 by William McKinstry, a British Army soldier who arrived in the area as a deserter in 1748, and is still owned by his descendants. Despite later modifications (notably the 19th century front dormer and side ell, and the application of siding), the basic 1 1/2-story five bay plan with twin chimneys is recognizable.

The house was listed on the National Register of Historic Places in 1989.

== See also ==
- National Register of Historic Places listings in Southbridge, Massachusetts
- National Register of Historic Places listings in Worcester County, Massachusetts
