= Theodore Harrington House =

Historic house in Massachusetts, United States

- U.S. National Register of Historic Places
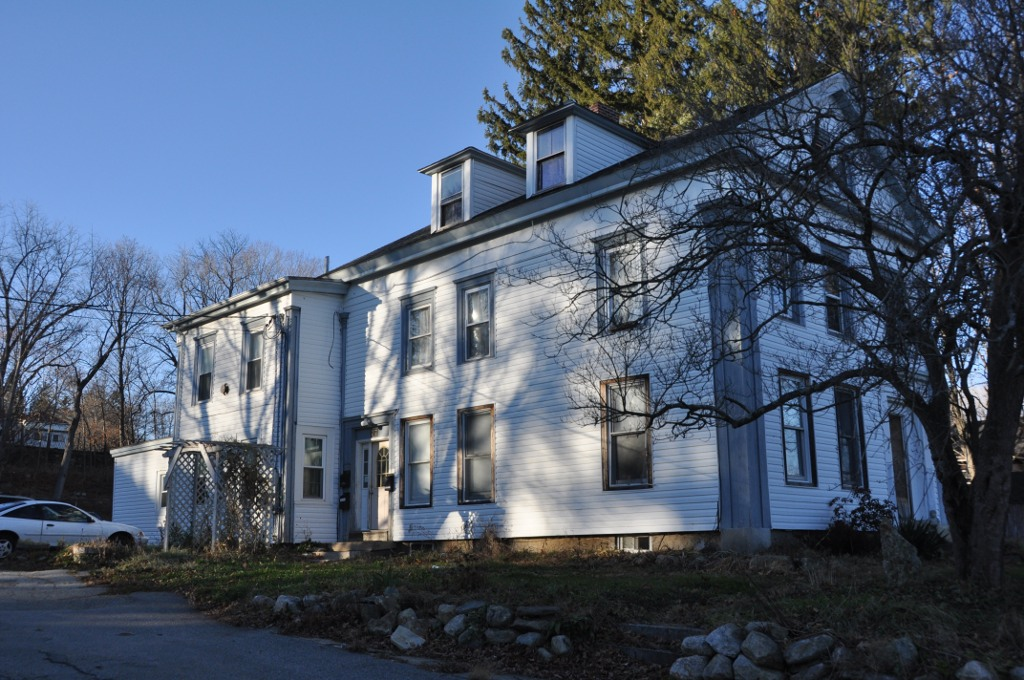

- Location within Massachusetts Location within the United States
- Location: 77 Hamilton St., Southbridge, Massachusetts
- Coordinates: 42°4′37″N 72°2′7″W
- Built: 1850
- Architectural style: Greek Revival
- MPS: Southbridge MRA
- NRHP reference No.: 89000557
- Added to NRHP: June 22, 1989

The Theodore Harrington House is a historic house at 77 Hamilton Street in Southbridge, Massachusetts.

== Description and history ==
The 2 1/2-story wood-frame house was one of the first houses built when Hamilton Street was laid out. It was built for Theodore Harrington, son of Henry Harrington, founder of Southbridge's Harrington Cutlery Company, a manufacturer of knives used in the manufacture of shoes. Its most notable feature is its ornate architrave and doorway with sidelights and transom window.

The house was listed on the National Register of Historic Places on June 22, 1989.

== See also ==
- National Register of Historic Places listings in Southbridge, Massachusetts
- National Register of Historic Places listings in Worcester County, Massachusetts
