= Ammidown-Harding Farmhouse =

Historic house in Massachusetts, United States

- Ammidown–Harding Farmhouse
- U.S. National Register of Historic Places
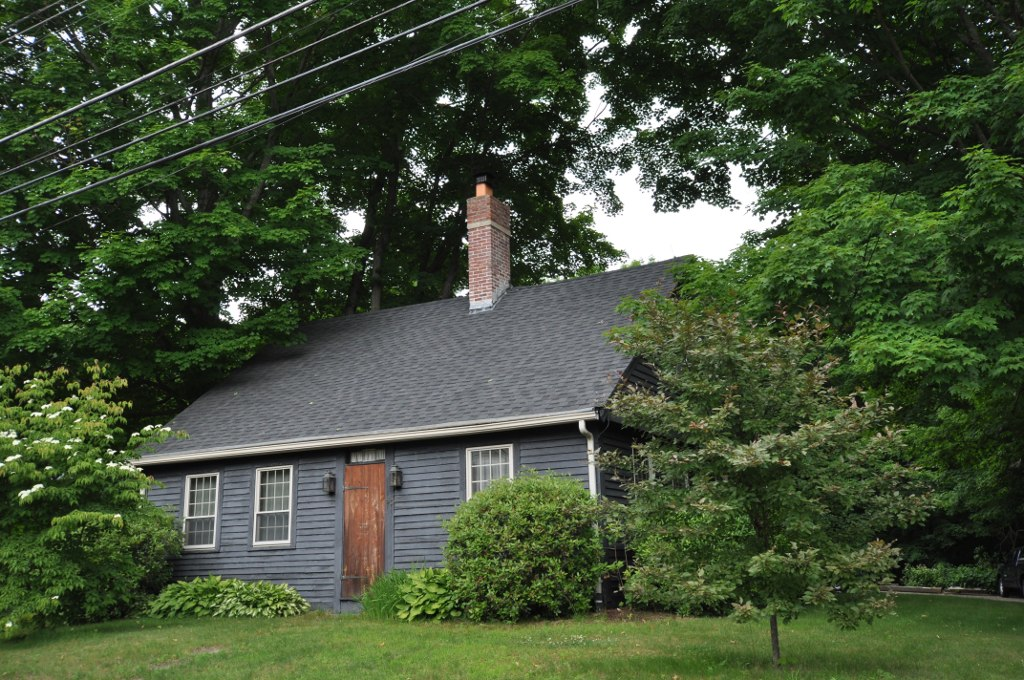

- Location within Massachusetts Location within the United States
- Location: 83 Lebanon Hill Rd., Southbridge, Massachusetts
- Coordinates: 42°3′35″N 72°2′5″W
- Architectural style: New England cape type
- MPS: Southbridge MRA
- NRHP reference No.: 89000552
- Added to NRHP: June 22, 1989

The Ammidown-Harding Farmhouse is a historic farm house at 83 Lebanon Hill Road in Southbridge, Massachusetts. Built sometime in the 18th century, it is one of Southbridge's few surviving houses from that time. It was added to the National Register of Historic Places in 1989. It is named for two of its notable residents, Cyrus Ammidown and Elbridge Harding, both of whom served as deacons in the Baptist church.

== Description and history ==
The Ammidown-Harding House is located in a rural area of southern Southbridge, on the east side of Lebanon Hill Road south of Elmwood Road. Lebanon Hill Road, originally a Native American trail, is one of the community's oldest roads. The house is 1 1/2 stories in height, with a gabled roof, large central chimney, and clapboarded exterior. Its main facade is four bays wide, with the entrance in the bay right of center.

The house's date of construction is uncertain; the earliest maps of Southbridge are from 1796, and the house appears on those. Its architectural features, notably a center chimney and a short four-bay facade, suggest that it was built in the years before or just after the American Revolutionary War. Other features that set the building apart are overhanging eaves and a transom window over the front door. The barn, a 19th-century construction with a cupola, bracketed eaves, and tongue and groove doors, is also a contributing feature.

The first documented owner was Cyrus Ammidown, a descendant of early settlers of the area; he also appears in local records as one of the first deacons in the local Baptist church, founded in 1817. Elbridge Harding, who owned the property by the 1860s, was the son of Joshua Harding, one of the petitioners to the state for the incorporation of Southbridge.

== See also ==
- National Register of Historic Places listings in Southbridge, Massachusetts
- National Register of Historic Places listings in Worcester County, Massachusetts
