= Hamilton Mill-West Street Factory Housing =

- Hamilton Mill–West Street Factory Housing
- U.S. National Register of Historic Places
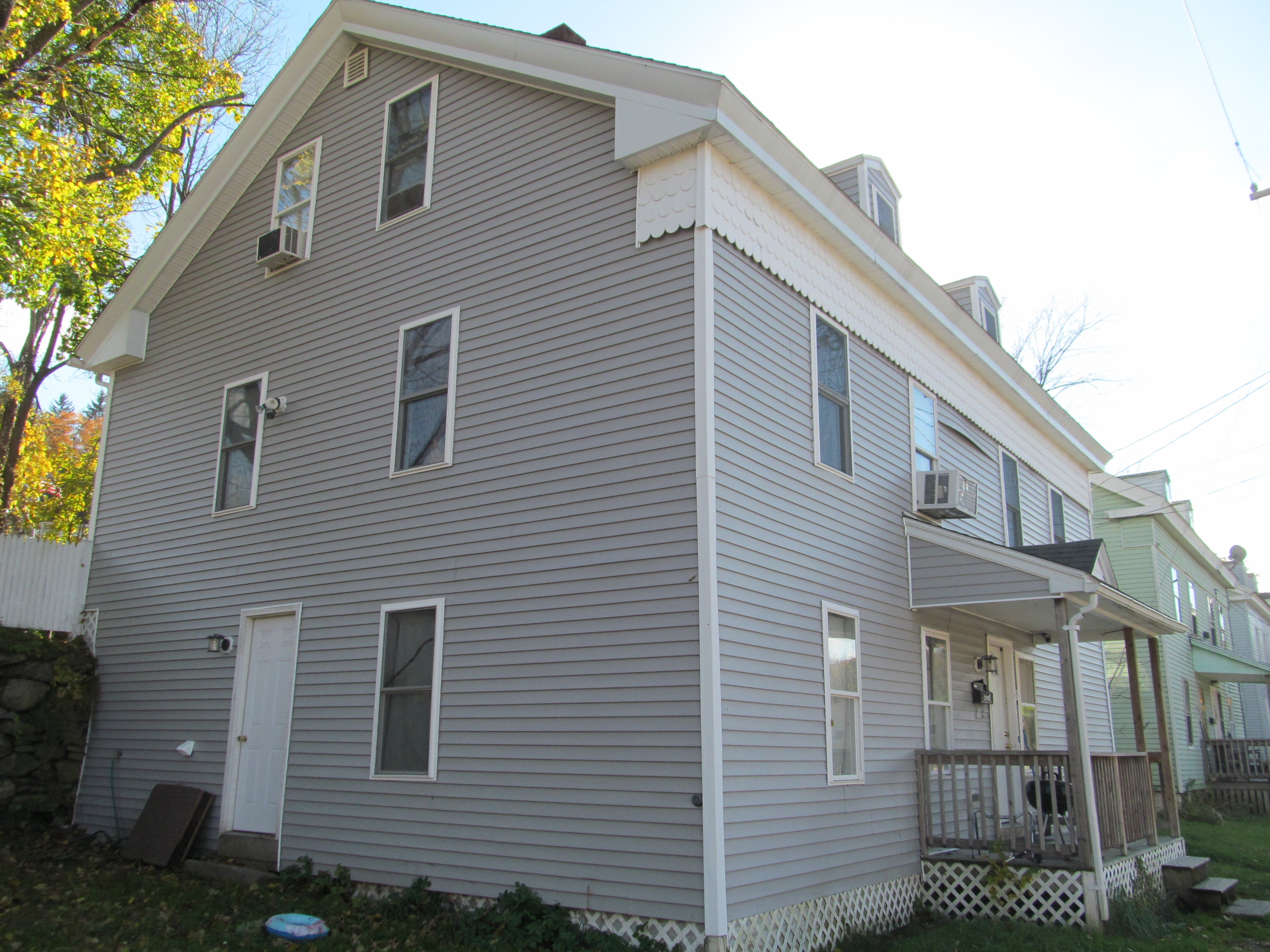
- 45 West Street

- Location within Massachusetts Location within the United States
- Location: 45 West St., Southbridge, Massachusetts
- Coordinates: 42°4′46″N 72°2′47″W
- Area: less than one acre
- Architectural style: Greek Revival
- MPS: Southbridge MRA
- NRHP reference No.: 89000541
- Added to NRHP: June 22, 1989

The Hamilton Mill—West Street Factory Housing is a historic house at 45 West Street in Southbridge, Massachusetts. Built in the second quarter of the 19th century, it was a particularly architecturally elaborate example of a worker tenement house with Greek Revival elements, and was listed on the National Register of Historic Places in 1989 for its architecture. It has since been resided, losing most of those features.

== Description and history ==
The Hamilton Mill—West Street Factory Housing is located in Southbridge's Globe Village area, on the south side of West Street west of Lovely Street. It is one of a row of three similar tenement houses, from which it is now relatively undistinguished. . It is a 2 1/2-story wood-frame house, with four doorways, two in front, and one on each of the sides. The building, at the time of its listing, had significantly more elaborate styling (in the Greek Revival style popular at the time of its construction), than typical worker housing from later in the 19th century. It had panel corner pilasters, which rose to an entablature that extended across the front, with corner returns on the sides. The front roof face is pierced by two gabled dormers, and the front entrance is sheltered by a shed-roof porch with a gabled peak at its center. Much of the building's fine styling has been removed or obscured by the application of modern siding.

The house was one of four identical tenements built sometime between about 1830 and 1850 to house workers at the nearby Hamilton Woolen Mill complex. Relatively few of these early company-built worker tenements survive in the city; one of the four in this group has been torn down.

== See also ==
- National Register of Historic Places listings in Southbridge, Massachusetts
- National Register of Historic Places listings in Worcester County, Massachusetts
