= Simon Plimpton Farmhouse =

Historic house in Massachusetts, United States

- U.S. National Register of Historic Places
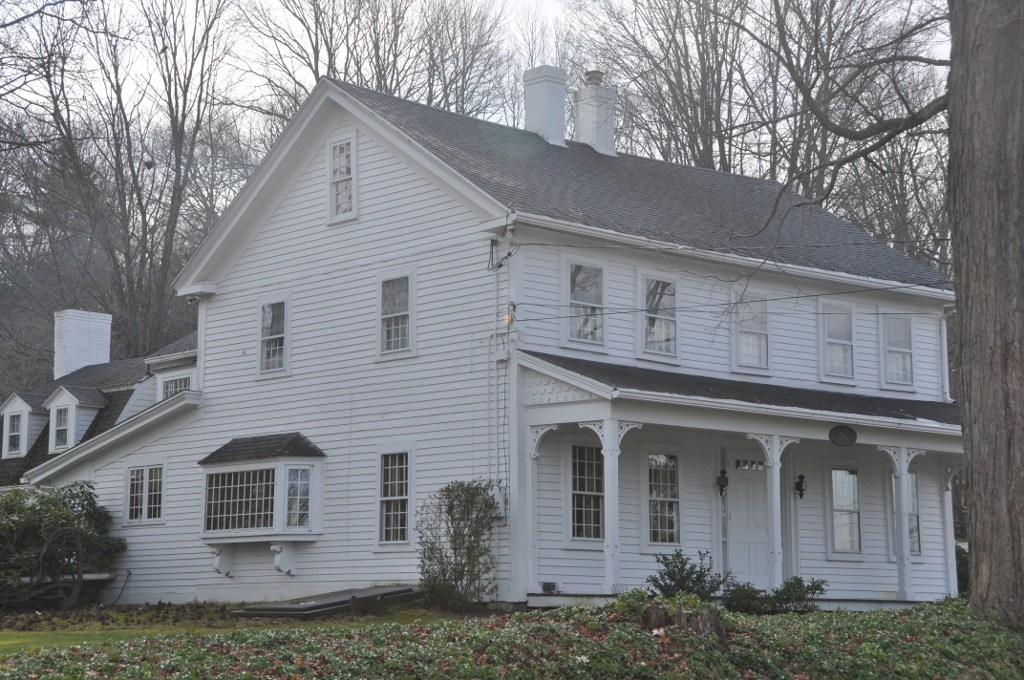

- Location within Massachusetts Location within the United States
- Location: 561 South St., Southbridge, Massachusetts
- Coordinates: 42°4′29″N 72°3′18″W
- Built: 1819
- Architectural style: Federal
- MPS: Southbridge MRA
- NRHP reference No.: 89000550
- Added to NRHP: June 22, 1989

The Simon Plimpton Farmhouse is a historic farm in Southbridge, Massachusetts. It was probably built about 1789 by Simon Plimpton and his brother Baxter on family-owned land. Baxter Plimpton eventually deeded his share over to Simon; the house has been in the hands of Plimpton descendants since. The house is a 2 1/2-story wood-frame house, five bays wide, with a center chimney. Although the house is nominally Federal in its styling, there are Greek Revival details (the broad eaves and door frames) that may have been added later. The full-width front porch is a late 19th-century addition.

The house was listed on the National Register of Historic Places in 1989.

== See also ==
- National Register of Historic Places listings in Southbridge, Massachusetts
- National Register of Historic Places listings in Worcester County, Massachusetts
