= J.J. Oakes House =

Historic house in Massachusetts, United States

- J. J. Oakes House
- U.S. National Register of Historic Places
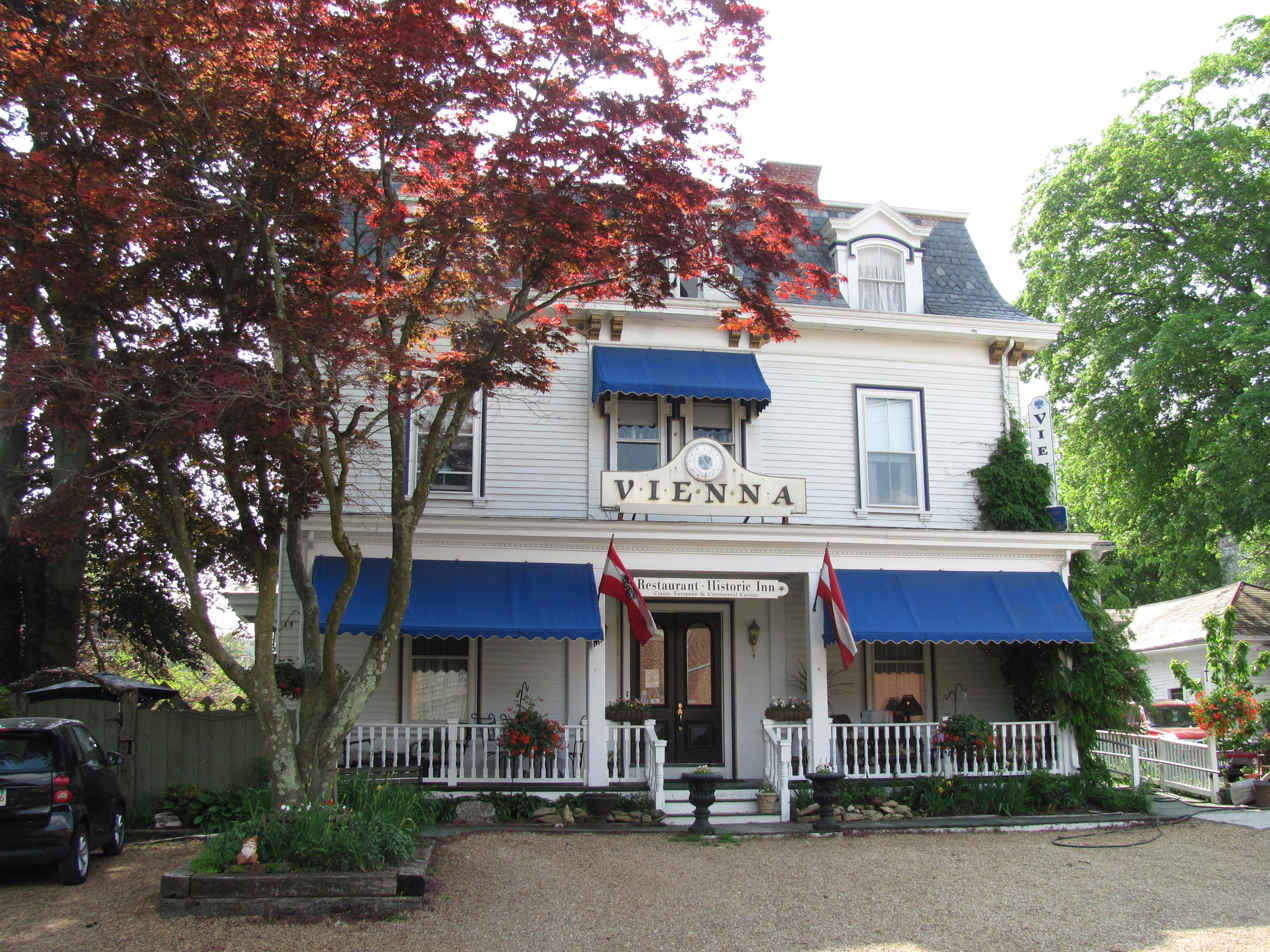
- J.J. Oakes House

- Location within Massachusetts Location within the United States
- Location: 14 South St., Southbridge, Massachusetts
- Coordinates: 42°4′39″N 72°2′20″W
- Architectural style: Second Empire, Italianate
- MPS: Southbridge MRA
- NRHP reference No.: 89000534
- Added to NRHP: June 22, 1989

The J. J. Oakes House is a historic house at 14 South Street in Southbridge, Massachusetts. It is one of a few surviving Second Empire houses in Southbridge. The two story wood-frame house was built sometime before 1870 for James Jacob Oakes, who grew up nearby, and owned a dry goods and clothing store in town. The house was later acquired by J. J. Delahanty, who owned a furniture store in the Alden-Delahanty Block in Globe Village. Although it is predominantly Second Empire in its styling (as indicated by the concave slate mansard roof), it also has significant Italianate detailing, including the three bay facade and bracketed eaves.

The house was listed on the National Register of Historic Places in 1989.

== See also ==
- National Register of Historic Places listings in Southbridge, Massachusetts
- National Register of Historic Places listings in Worcester County, Massachusetts
