= Dani and Soldani Cabinet Makers and Wood Workers Factory =

- U.S. National Register of Historic Places
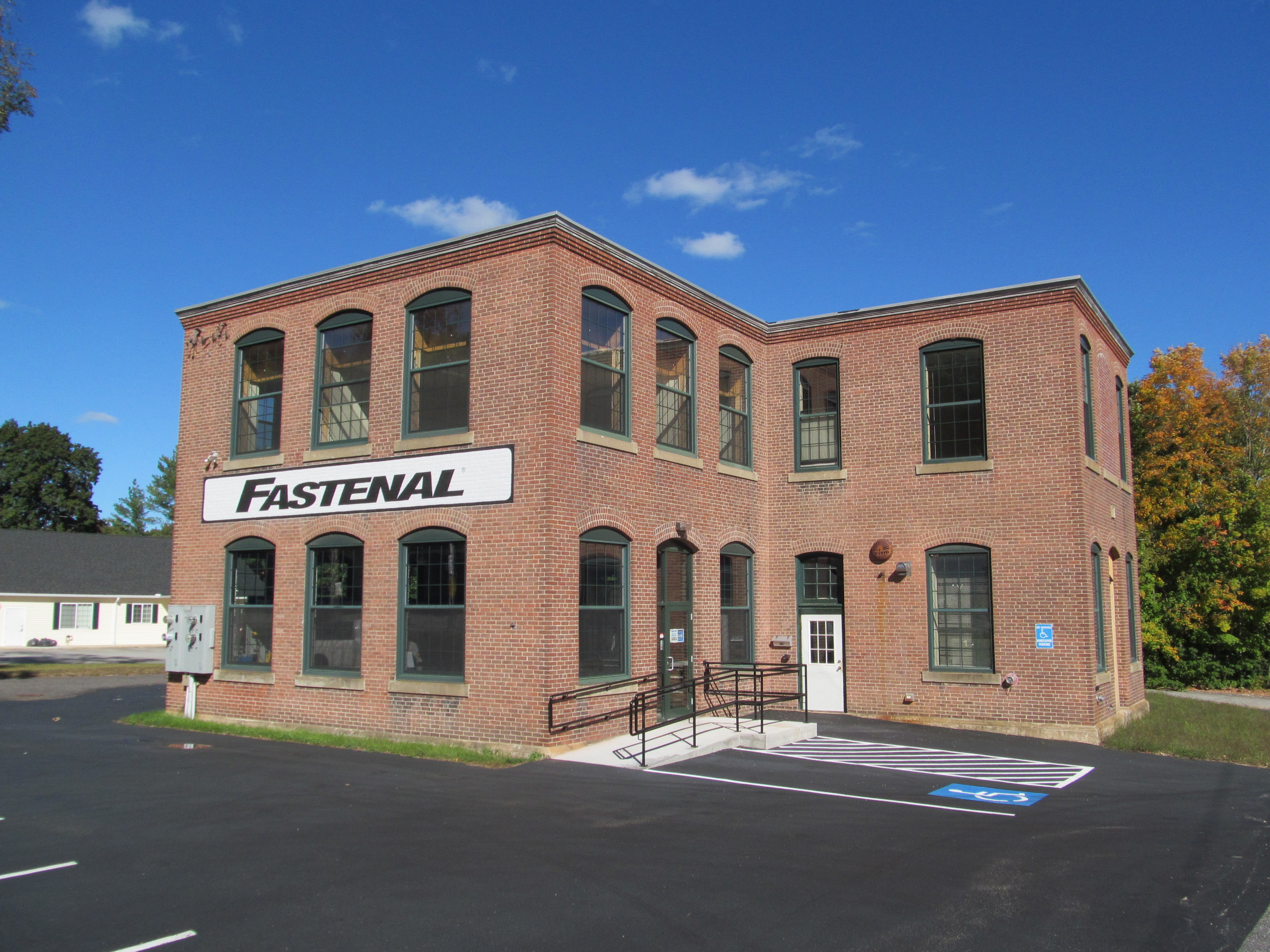
- Dani and Soldani Cabinet Makers and Wood Workers Factory

- Location within Massachusetts Location within the United States
- Location: 484 Worcester St., Southbridge, Massachusetts
- Coordinates: 42°5′26″N 72°1′22″W
- Built: 1914
- Architectural style: Brick industrial
- MPS: Southbridge MRA
- NRHP reference No.: 89000529
- Added to NRHP: June 22, 1989

The Dani and Soldani Cabinet Makers and Wood Workers Factory is a historic factory building at 484 Worcester Street in Southbridge, Massachusetts. Built in 1914, it is a good example of a small early-20th century factory, and is important for its association with both the locally significant optical industry, and its history of Italian immigration. The building was listed on the National Register of Historic Places in 1989.

== Description and history ==
The former Dani and Soldani Cabinet Makers and Wood Workers Factory is located north of downtown Southbridge, at the northeast corner of Worcester Street (Massachusetts Route 169) and Vinton Street. It is a modest T-shaped brick structure, two stories in height and covered by a flat roof. Doors and windows are set in segmented-arch openings, and windows have concrete sills. The principal adornment of the exterior is a band of brick corbelling at the roofline.

The building was built about 1914 for the Optical Lens Company, a short-lived business apparently seeking to capitalize on the success of the nearby American Optical Company. In 1926 the building was purchased by Eugenio Dani and Giovanni Soldani, Italian immigrants who had started a cabinet-making business at their home on Elm Street in 1912. Their workshop was the first major Italian-originated business in Southbridge. They also make chairs, table, cabinets and tool handles. It continues to be used for light industrial manufacturing.

== See also ==
- National Register of Historic Places listings in Southbridge, Massachusetts
- National Register of Historic Places listings in Worcester County, Massachusetts
