= Upper Chapin Street Historic District =

Historic district in Massachusetts, United States

- U.S. National Register of Historic Places
- U.S. Historic district
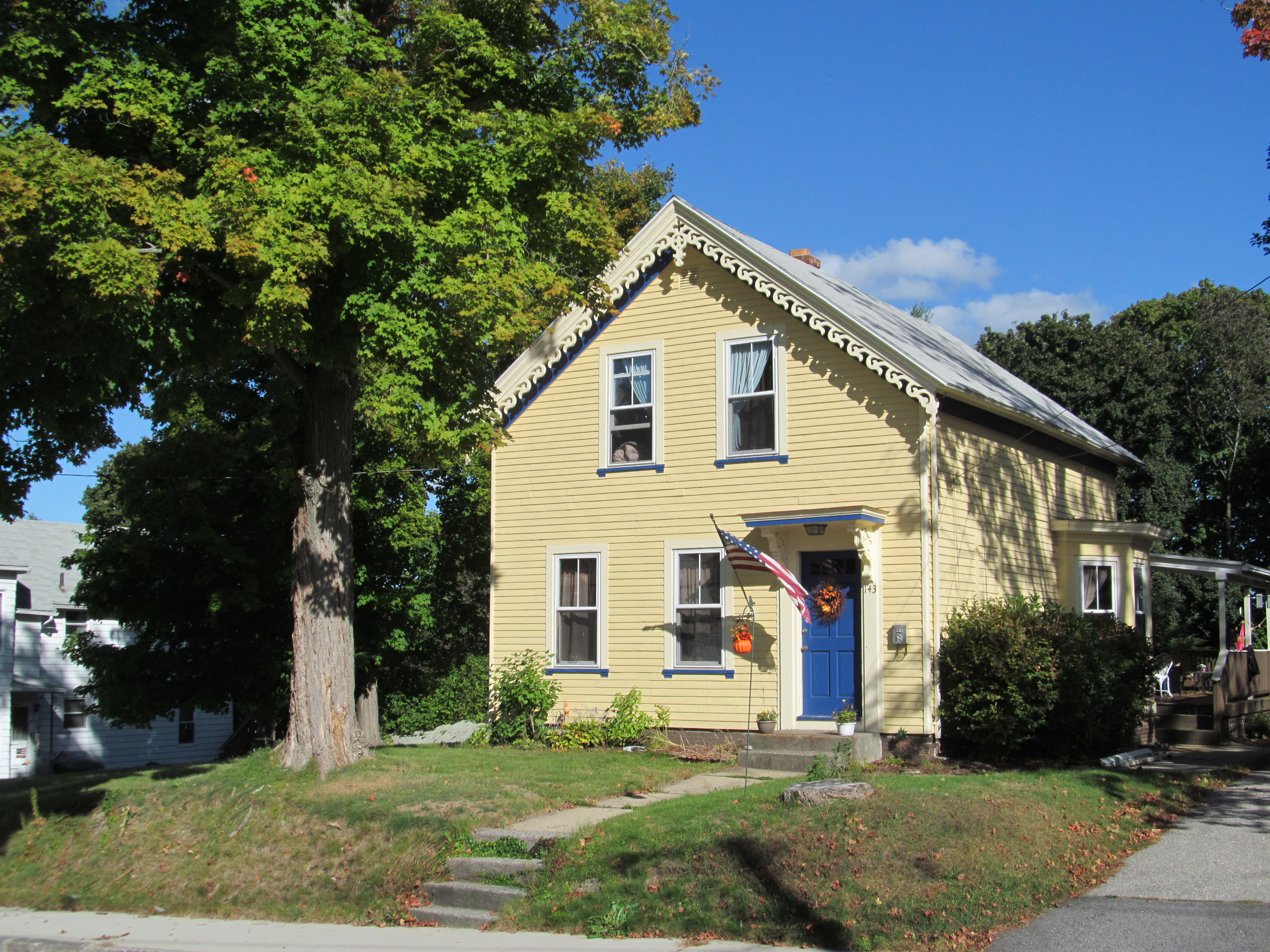
- Chapin Street at Forest Avenue

- Location within Massachusetts Location within the United States
- Location: Chapin St. at Forest Ave., Southbridge, Massachusetts
- Coordinates: 42°4′20″N 72°2′15″W
- Architectural style: Gothic, Italianate, Queen Anne
- MPS: Southbridge MRA
- NRHP reference No.: 89000599
- Added to NRHP: June 22, 1989

The Upper Chapin Street Historic District is a residential historic district on Chapin Street in Southbridge, Massachusetts. The district includes fourteen Victorian houses on Chapin Street, thirteen of which lie between Forest Avenue and Dresser Street, and two of which are just south of Forest. All of these houses, almost all of which were built in the 1870s, are well preserved, making it one of the most intact period neighborhoods in the city.

Most of the houses in the district are relatively small cottage-style houses, either 1.5 or two stories, with Italianate and Gothic Revival style decoration. There is one house in the district with Queen Anne styling, and two in the Stick style. Only one property, 132 Chapin Street, does not contribute to the district. The district was added to the National Register of Historic Places in 1989.

== See also ==
- National Register of Historic Places listings in Southbridge, Massachusetts
- National Register of Historic Places listings in Worcester County, Massachusetts
