= House at 91 Coombs Street =

Historic house in Massachusetts, United States

- U.S. National Register of Historic Places
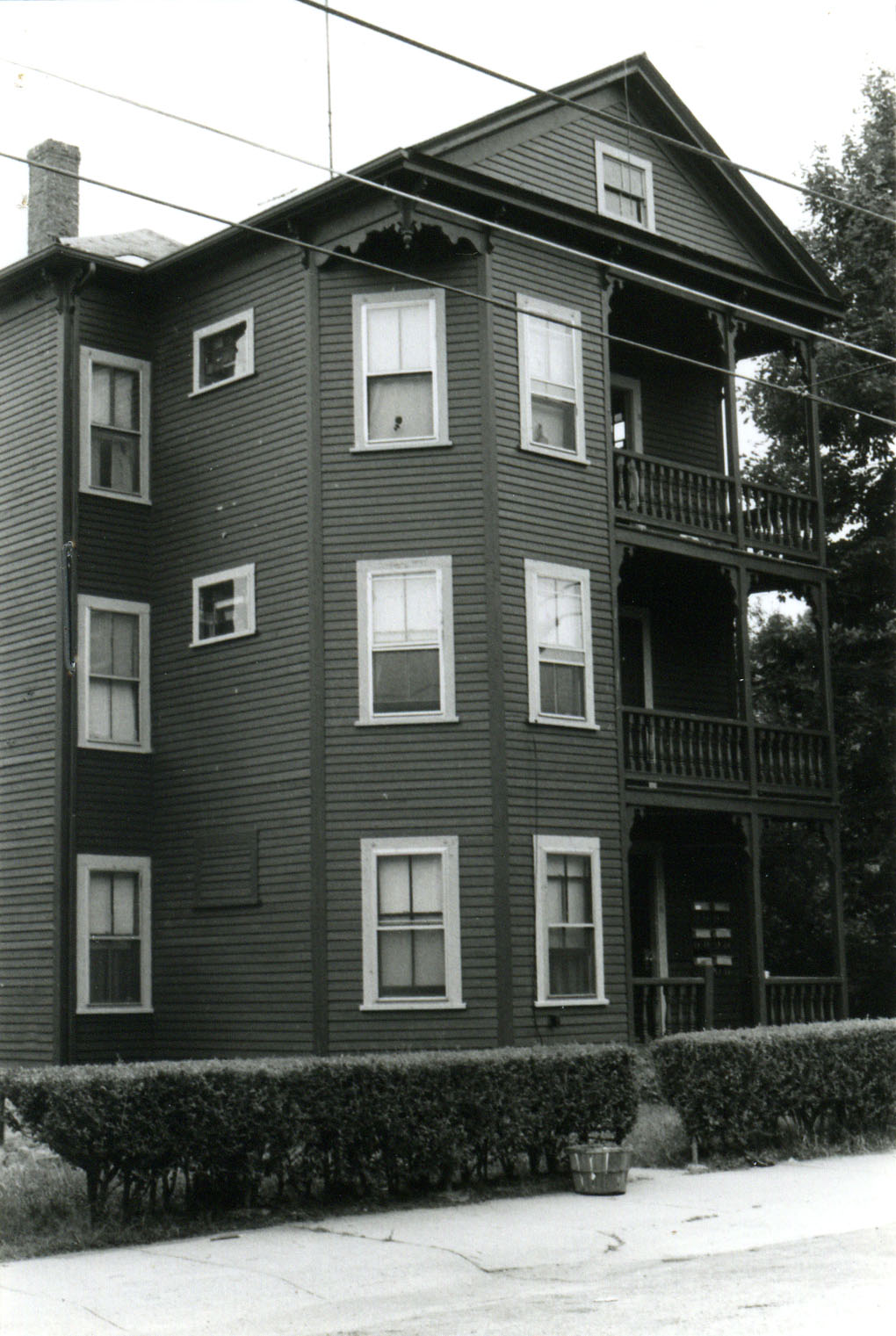
- c. 1986 photo

- Location within Massachusetts Location within the United States
- Location: 91 Coombs St., Southbridge, Massachusetts
- Coordinates: 42°4′18″N 72°1′48″W
- Built: 1905
- Architectural style: Queen Anne, Vernacular Queen Anne
- MPS: Southbridge MRA
- NRHP reference No.: 89000525
- Added to NRHP: June 22, 1989

The House at 91 Coombs Street in Southbridge, Massachusetts was, at the time of its listing on the National Register of Historic Places in 1989, a well-preserved example of a three-decker built early in the 20th century. Of similar period three-deckers on Coombs Street, it was the only one that had not been significantly altered, with original Queen Anne trim elements, including turned balustrade and porch posts, and decorative stained glass windows. Since then, it has apparently been demolished; a modern duplex now stands on the property.

== See also ==
- National Register of Historic Places listings in Southbridge, Massachusetts
- National Register of Historic Places listings in Worcester County, Massachusetts
