= Smith–Lyon Farmhouse =

Historic house in Massachusetts, United States

- U.S. National Register of Historic Places
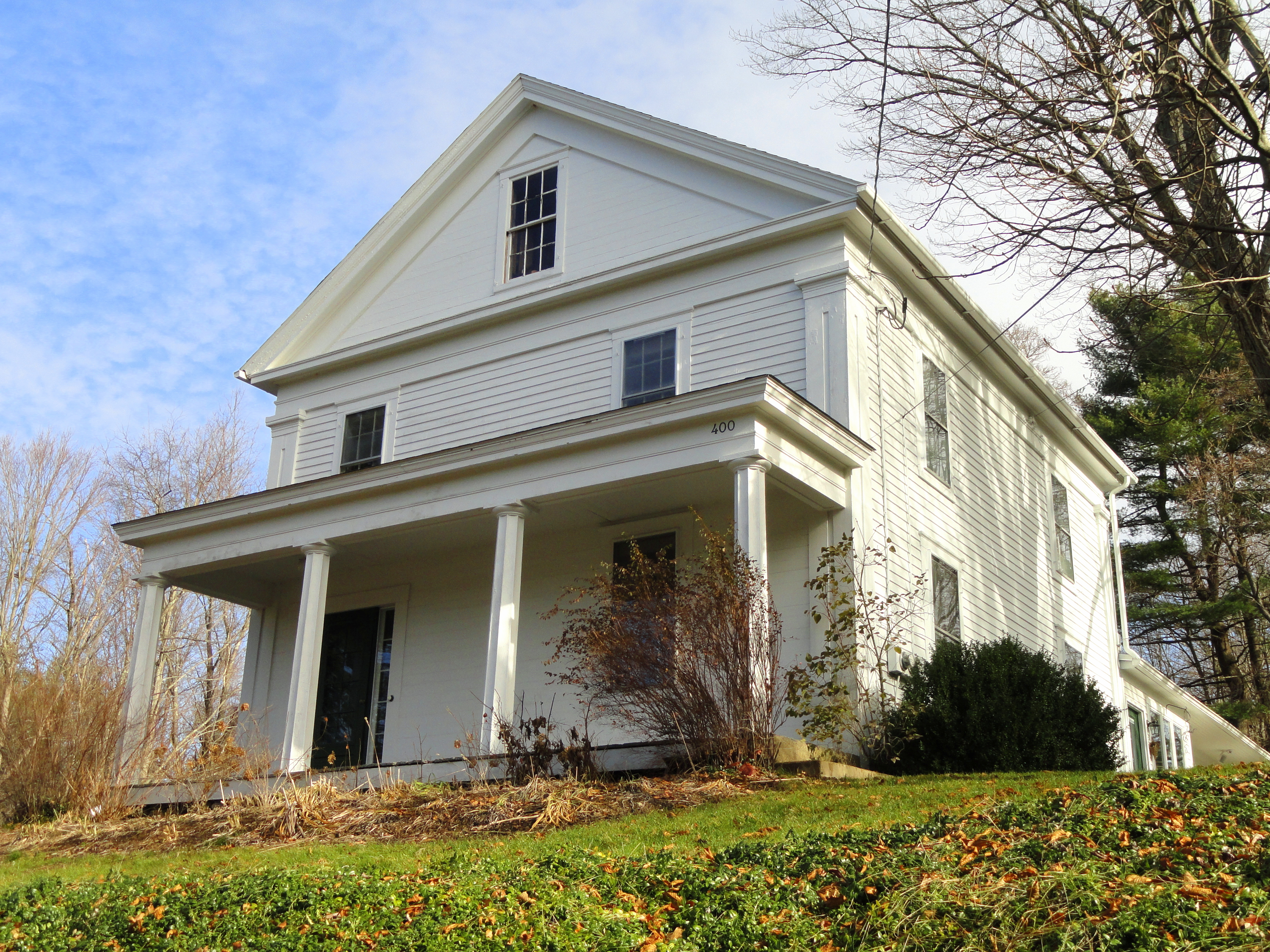

- Location within Massachusetts Location within the United States
- Location: 400 N. Woodstock Rd., Southbridge, Massachusetts
- Coordinates: 42°3′18″N 72°1′0″W
- Built: 1850
- Architectural style: Greek Revival
- MPS: Southbridge MRA
- NRHP reference No.: 89000546
- Added to NRHP: June 22, 1989

The Smith–Lyon Farmhouse is a historic farm at 400 N. Woodstock Road in Southbridge, Massachusetts. It is an unusual example of a well-preserved rural Greek Revival house in Southbridge. It is a 2 1/2-story wood-frame house. The gable-end front facade features full-length sidelights around the door, pilastered corner trim, a pedimented gable, and a full-width porch with Doric columns. It is reported by have been built c. 1850 by Luther Smith, a mule dealer. By 1878 the farm was owned by Lucius Lyon.

The house was listed on the National Register of Historic Places in 1989.

== See also ==
- National Register of Historic Places listings in Southbridge, Massachusetts
- National Register of Historic Places listings in Worcester County, Massachusetts
