= National Register of Historic Places listings in Southbridge, Massachusetts =

The following properties in Southbridge, Massachusetts are listed on the National Register of Historic Places.

This National Park Service list is complete through NPS recent listings posted May 1, 2026.

== Southbridge ==
	Name on the Register	Image	Date listed	Location	Description
1	Academie Brochu	Academie Brochu	June 22, 1989 (#89000568)	29 Pine St. 42°04′46″N 72°02′17″W	
2	William E. Alden House	William E. Alden House	June 22, 1989 (#89000562)	428 Hamilton St. 42°04′55″N 72°02′28″W	
3	Alden-Delahanty Block	Alden-Delahanty Block	June 22, 1989 (#89000572)	858 Main St. 42°04′54″N 72°02′46″W	
4	American Optical Company Historic District	American Optical Company Historic District	May 3, 2023 (#100008957)	Optical Dr., Mechanic, Case, Cabot, Charlton, Main, and Wells Sts. 42°04′29″N 72°01′24″W	
5	Ammidown-Harding Farmhouse	Ammidown-Harding Farmhouse	June 22, 1989 (#89000552)	83 Lebanon Hill Rd. 42°03′35″N 72°02′05″W	
6	Ashland Mill Tenement	Ashland Mill Tenement	June 22, 1989 (#89000545)	141–145 Ashland Ave. 42°03′55″N 72°00′37″W	
7	Bacon-Morse Historic District	Bacon-Morse Historic District	June 22, 1989 (#89000602)	N. Woodstock Rd. at Tipton Rock Rd. 42°02′09″N 72°00′48″W	
8	Beechwood	Beechwood	June 22, 1989 (#89000527)	495 Main St. 42°04′38″N 72°02′18″W	
9	Alexis Boyer House	Alexis Boyer House	June 22, 1989 (#89000560)	306 Hamilton; 42°04′53″N 72°02′16″W	
10	Building at 25–27 River Street	Building at 25–27 River Street	June 22, 1989 (#89000574)	25–27 River St. 42°04′56″N 72°02′21″W	
11	Building at 29–31 River Street	Building at 29–31 River Street	June 22, 1989 (#89000575)	29–31 River St. 42°04′56″N 72°02′21″W	
12	Building at 38–42 Worcester Street	Building at 38–42 Worcester Street	June 22, 1989 (#89000589)	38–42 Worcester St. 42°04′46″N 72°01′47″W	
13	Building at 52 Main Street	Building at 52 Main Street	June 22, 1989 (#89000583)	52 Main St. 42°04′24″N 72°01′39″W	
14	Central Mills Historic District	Central Mills Historic District	June 22, 1989 (#89000595)	Roughly bounded by the Quinebaug River, North St., and Central St. 42°04′37″N 72°01′53″W	
15	Centre Village Historic District	Centre Village Historic District	September 7, 1979 (#79000379)	Along Main St. 42°04′32″N 72°02′04″W	
16	Chamberlain-Bordeau House	Chamberlain-Bordeau House	June 22, 1989 (#89000569)	718 Main St. 42°04′49″N 72°02′35″W	
17	Chapin Block	Chapin Block	June 22, 1989 (#89000558)	208–222 Hamilton; 42°04′48″N 72°02′08″W	
18	Alpha M. Cheney House	Alpha M. Cheney House	June 22, 1989 (#89000526)	61 Chestnut St. 42°04′16″N 72°01′39″W	
19	J.M. Cheney Rental House	J.M. Cheney Rental House	June 22, 1989 (#89000564)	32 Edwards St. 42°04′44″N 72°02′10″W	
20	Clarke-Glover Farmhouse	Clarke-Glover Farmhouse	June 22, 1989 (#89000536)	201 South St. 42°04′34″N 72°02′45″W	
21	Cliff Cottage	Cliff Cottage	June 22, 1989 (#89000570)	787 Mill St. 42°05′01″N 72°02′29″W	
22	E. Merritt Cole House	E. Merritt Cole House	June 22, 1989 (#89000576)	386 Main St. 42°04′36″N 72°02′08″W	
23	Comins-Wall House	Comins-Wall House	June 22, 1989 (#89000555)	42 Hamilton St. 42°04′35″N 72°02′04″W	
24	Elm Street Congregational Church	Elm Street Congregational Church	June 22, 1989 (#89000591)	61 Elm St. 42°04′23″N 72°02′06″W	
25	E. B. Cummings House	E. B. Cummings House	June 22, 1989 (#89000566)	52 Marcy St. 42°04′43″N 72°02′15″W	
26	Dani and Soldani Cabinet Makers and Wood Workers Factory	Dani and Soldani Cabinet Makers and Wood Workers Factory	June 22, 1989 (#89000529)	484 Worcester St. 42°05′26″N 72°01′22″W	
27	Dennison School House	Dennison School House	June 22, 1989 (#89000551)	Dennison Ln. 42°03′38″N 72°03′42″W	
28	Sylvester Dresser House	Sylvester Dresser House	June 22, 1989 (#89000523)	29 Summer St. 42°04′18″N 72°02′05″W	
29	Dunbar-Vinton House	Dunbar-Vinton House	June 22, 1989 (#89000573)	Hook and Hamilton Sts. 42°04′38″N 72°02′03″W	
30	Henry E. Durfee Farmhouse	Henry E. Durfee Farmhouse	June 22, 1989 (#89000547)	281 Eastford Rd. 42°03′49″N 72°02′33″W	
31	Elm Street Fire House	Elm Street Fire House	June 22, 1989 (#89000530)	24 Elm St. 42°04′27″N 72°02′06″W	
32	Evangelical Free Church	Evangelical Free Church	June 22, 1989 (#89000561)	Hamilton St. 42°04′55″N 72°02′29″W	
33	James Gleason Cottage	James Gleason Cottage	June 22, 1989 (#89000533)	31 Sayles St. 42°04′45″N 72°02′37″W	
34	Globe Village Fire House	Globe Village Fire House	June 22, 1989 (#89000540)	West St. at Main St. 42°04′47″N 72°02′45″W	
35	Glover Street Historic District	Glover Street Historic District	June 22, 1989 (#89000601)	Glover St. between High and Poplar Sts. 42°04′28″N 72°02′49″W	
36	Hamilton Mill Brick House	Hamilton Mill Brick House	June 22, 1989 (#89000542)	16 High St. 42°04′48″N 72°02′43″W	
37	Hamilton Mill-West Street Factory Housing	Hamilton Mill-West Street Factory Housing	June 22, 1989 (#89000541)	45 West St. 42°04′46″N 72°02′47″W	
38	Hamilton Millwright-Agent's House	Hamilton Millwright-Agent's House	June 22, 1989 (#89000543)	757–761 Main St. 42°04′48″N 72°02′40″W	
39	Hamilton Woolen Company Historic District	Hamilton Woolen Company Historic District	June 22, 1989 (#89000594)	Roughly bounded by McKinstry Brook, the Quinebaug River, and Mill St. 42°04′56″N 72°02′37″W	
40	Theodore Harrington House	Theodore Harrington House	June 22, 1989 (#89000557)	77 Hamilton St. 42°04′37″N 72°02′07″W	
41	George H. Hartwell House	George H. Hartwell House	June 22, 1989 (#89000556)	105 Hamilton St. 42°04′39″N 72°02′08″W	
42	Samuel C. Hartwell House	Samuel C. Hartwell House	June 22, 1989 (#89000592)	79 Elm St. 42°04′22″N 72°02′07″W	
43	High-School Streets Historic District	High-School Streets Historic District	June 22, 1989 (#89000600)	High St. at School St. 42°04′40″N 72°02′45″W	
44	William Hodgson Two-Family House	William Hodgson Two-Family House	June 22, 1989 (#89000578)	103–105 Sayles St. 42°04′38″N 72°02′38″W	Probably demolished.
45	House at 3 Dean Street	House at 3 Dean Street	June 22, 1989 (#89000587)	3 Dean St. 42°04′32″N 72°01′42″W	
46	House at 18 Walnut Street	House at 18 Walnut Street	June 22, 1989 (#89000580)	18 Walnut St. 42°04′25″N 72°01′46″W	
47	House at 34 Benefit Street	House at 34 Benefit Street	June 22, 1989 (#89000585)	34 Benefit St. 42°04′31″N 72°01′46″W	
48	House at 59–63 Crystal Street	House at 59–63 Crystal Street	June 22, 1989 (#89000584)	59–63 Crystal St. 42°04′29″N 72°01′40″W	
49	House at 64 Main Street	House at 64 Main Street	June 22, 1989 (#89000582)	64 Main St. 42°04′23″N 72°01′41″W	
50	House at 70–72 Main Street	House at 70–72 Main Street	June 22, 1989 (#89000581)	70–72 Main St. 42°04′23″N 72°01′43″W	
51	House at 91 Coombs Street	House at 91 Coombs Street	June 22, 1989 (#89000525)	91 Coombs St. 42°04′18″N 72°01′48″W	Probably demolished.
52	Judson-Litchfield House	Judson-Litchfield House	June 22, 1989 (#89000539)	313 South St. 42°04′34″N 72°03′01″W	
53	A. Kinney House	A. Kinney House	June 22, 1989 (#89000565)	42 Edwards St. 42°04′44″N 72°02′12″W	
54	LaCroix-Mosher House	LaCroix-Mosher House	June 22, 1989 (#89000524)	56 Everett St. 42°04′21″N 72°02′02″W	
55	Napoleon LaRochelle Two-Family House	Napoleon LaRochelle Two-Family House	June 22, 1989 (#89000567)	30 Pine St. 42°04′51″N 72°03′00″W	
56	Maple Street Historic District	Maple Street Historic District	June 22, 1989 (#89000597)	Maple St. 42°04′26″N 72°01′43″W	
57	Mrs. R. Marcy House	Mrs. R. Marcy House	June 22, 1989 (#89000535)	64 South St. 42°04′38″N 72°02′28″W	
58	William McKinstry Farmhouse	William McKinstry Farmhouse	June 22, 1989 (#89000571)	361 Pleasant St. 42°05′41″N 72°02′35″W	
59	William McKinstry Jr. House	William McKinstry Jr. House	June 22, 1989 (#89000528)	915 W. Main St. 42°04′55″N 72°02′52″W	
60	H. Morse House	H. Morse House	June 22, 1989 (#89000538)	230 South St. 42°04′34″N 72°02′50″W	
61	New York, New Haven & Hartford Passenger Depot	New York, New Haven & Hartford Passenger Depot	June 22, 1989 (#89000554)	Depot St. 42°04′37″N 72°02′00″W	
62	Notre Dame Catholic Church	Notre Dame Catholic Church	June 22, 1989 (#89000563)	Main St. at Marcy St. 42°04′40″N 72°02′13″W	
63	J.J. Oakes House	J.J. Oakes House	June 22, 1989 (#89000534)	14 South St. 42°04′39″N 72°02′20″W	
64	E.M. Phillips House	E.M. Phillips House	June 22, 1989 (#89000532)	35 Dresser St. 42°04′25″N 72°02′12″W	
65	Simon Plimpton Farmhouse	Simon Plimpton Farmhouse	June 22, 1989 (#89000550)	561 South St. 42°04′29″N 72°03′18″W	
66	Stephen Richard House	Stephen Richard House	June 22, 1989 (#89000522)	239–241 Elm St. 42°04′06″N 72°02′11″W	
67	Sacred Heart Church Historic District	Sacred Heart Church Historic District	June 22, 1989 (#89000598)	Charlton St. 42°04′40″N 72°01′44″W	
68	Smith-Lyon Farmhouse	Smith-Lyon Farmhouse	June 22, 1989 (#89000546)	400 N. Woodstock Rd. 42°03′18″N 72°01′00″W	
69	Southbridge Town Hall	Southbridge Town Hall	November 20, 1987 (#87001378)	41 Elm St. 42°04′23″N 72°02′05″W	
70	St. George's Greek Orthodox Church	St. George's Greek Orthodox Church	June 22, 1989 (#89000579)	55 North St. 42°04′36″N 72°01′48″W	
71	St. Peter's Roman Catholic Church-St. Mary's School	St. Peter's Roman Catholic Church-St. Mary's School	June 22, 1989 (#89000559)	263 Hamilton St. 42°04′51″N 72°02′16″W	Destroyed by fire in 1999.
72	Lorenzo R. Stone House	Lorenzo R. Stone House	June 22, 1989 (#89000537)	218 South St. 42°04′35″N 72°02′48″W	
73	George Sumner House	George Sumner House	June 22, 1989 (#89000577)	32 Paige Hill Rd. 42°04′44″N 72°01′54″W	
74	Eugene Tapin House	Eugene Tapin House	June 22, 1989 (#89000549)	215 Lebanon Hill Rd. 42°03′21″N 72°02′15″W	
75	Tiffany-Leonard House	Tiffany-Leonard House	June 22, 1989 (#89000590)	25 Elm St. 42°04′26″N 72°02′04″W	
76	Twinehurst American Optical Company Neighborhood	Twinehurst American Optical Company Neighborhood	June 22, 1989 (#89000593)	Twinehurst Place; 42°04′42″N 72°01′57″W	Residential district on Twinehurst Place; does not include company factory buildings.
77	Upper Chapin Street Historic District	Upper Chapin Street Historic District	June 22, 1989 (#89000599)	Chapin St. at Forest Ave. 42°04′20″N 72°02′15″W	
78	Vinton-Boardman Farmhouse	Vinton-Boardman Farmhouse	June 22, 1989 (#89000586)	93 Torrey Rd. 42°05′07″N 72°00′33″W	
79	Vinton-Torrey House	Vinton-Torrey House	June 22, 1989 (#89000588)	5 Torrey Rd. 42°05′05″N 72°00′32″W	
80	George B. and Ruth D. Wells House	George B. and Ruth D. Wells House	June 22, 1989 (#89000548)	Durfee Rd. 42°03′43″N 72°03′01″W	
81	H.C. Wells Double House	H.C. Wells Double House	June 22, 1989 (#89000531)	28–30 Dresser St. 42°04′26″N 72°02′10″W	
82	John M. Wells House	John M. Wells House	June 22, 1989 (#89000553)	491 Eastford Rd. 42°03′32″N 72°02′55″W	
83	Mary E. Wells School	Mary E. Wells School	May 3, 2023 (#100008958)	80 Marcy St. 42°04′40″N 72°02′15″W	
84	Albert H. Wheeler House	Albert H. Wheeler House	June 22, 1989 (#89000544)	219 South St. 42°04′34″N 72°02′47″W	
85	Windsor Court Historic District	Windsor Court Historic District	June 22, 1989 (#89000596)	Windsor Ct. at North St. 42°04′33″N 72°01′52″W	
