= Mrs. R. Marcy House =

Historic house in Massachusetts, United States

- U.S. National Register of Historic Places
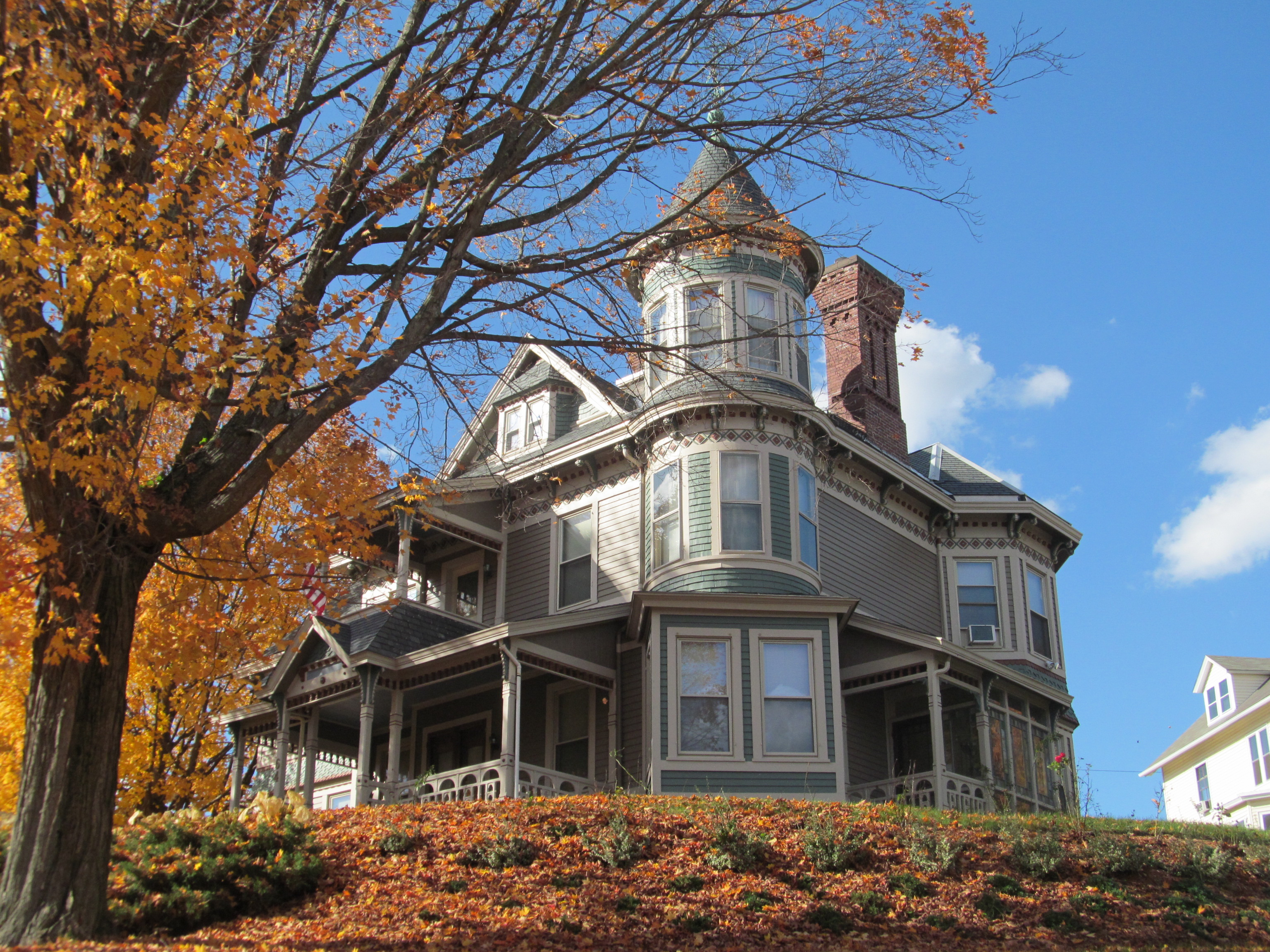
- 64 South Street

- Location within Massachusetts Location within the United States
- Location: 64 South St., Southbridge, Massachusetts
- Coordinates: 42°4′38″N 72°2′28″W
- Architectural style: Queen Anne
- MPS: Southbridge MRA
- NRHP reference No.: 89000535
- Added to NRHP: June 22, 1989

Mrs. R. Marcy House is a historic house at 64 South Street in Southbridge, Massachusetts. It is one of a few high style Queene Anne Victorian houses in Southbridge. It was built sometime before 1898, when it was listed as being owned by Mrs. Rinda Marcy, widow of Merrick Marcy. Nothing is known of the Marcys, other than their probable descent from one of Southbridge's early settlers. The house has a typical asymmetrical design, with multiple shapes of wood shingling, carved ornamental decorations, and bracketed eaves.

The house was listed on the National Register of Historic Places in 1989.

== See also ==
- National Register of Historic Places listings in Southbridge, Massachusetts
- National Register of Historic Places listings in Worcester County, Massachusetts
