= Ann Keefe =

American activist and nun (1952–2015)

Sister Ann Keefe
- Church: St. Michael's Roman Catholic Church, Convent, Rectory, and School

Personal details
- Born: 1952 Warren, Massachusetts
- Died: 2015 (aged 62–63) South Side, Providence, Rhode Island
- Denomination: Roman Catholicism
- Education: Fordham University

Sister Ann Keefe (1952–2015) was an American activist, a nun in the Congregation of the Sisters of St. Joseph, and the co-founder of The Nonviolence Institute, which significantly reduced the murder rate in Providence, Rhode Island.

== Early life ==
Keefe grew up in Warren, Massachusetts, the third-oldest of nine children. Her father was a liquor salesman and her mother worked for Polaroid and was a teacher. Her family regularly attended church. Keefe's parents were inspired by the civil rights movement and the evolution of the church through the Second Vatican Council. Keefe was inspired by the nuns at her school, Marianhill Central Catholic High School, and their passion for social justice. In 1970, Keefe joined the Sisters of St. Joseph of Springfield, Massachusetts and attended Elms College. She went to graduate school at Fordham University, where she earned her Master of Social Work degree. In 1982, she joined the team ministry at St. Michael's in Providence.

== The Nonviolence Institute ==
In 2000, Keefe and Father Ray Malm co-founded the Institute for the Study and Practice of Nonviolence, now named The Nonviolence Institute, in response to escalating gang violence and the murder of 15-year-old, Jennifer Rivera. According to The Providence Journal, the organization utilizes "a group of street workers (including former gang members) who mediate disputes and try to steer teenagers away from gangs." Staff members work in schools, homes, hospitals, prisons, and other community spaces to intervene with nonviolence.

== Providence ¡CityArts! for Youth ==
In 1992, Keefe started Providence ¡CityArts! for Youth which has, "provided free arts education and training to more than 5,000 Providence elementary and middle school youth, most from the ethnically and culturally diverse neighborhoods on Providence’s Southside." Keefe started the organization after a group of boys rocked her car as a prank, causing her to be concerned with the lack of creative outlets available for local youth.

The organization works with 500 youth a year in an effort to foster creativity and confidence in children. In 2014, the organization received the National Arts and Humanities Youth Program Award from Michelle Obama. The award granted the nonprofit "$10,000 and a year of communications and capacity-building support from the President’s Committee on the Arts and the Humanities."

== Taming Asthma ==
In 1998, Keefe co-founded, with Diane Sangermano, Taming Asthma, a free asthma treatment organization for uninsured and underinsured residents in Rhode Island. By 2003, the organization's volunteer physicians and respiratory therapists served 500 patients a year. For their work with Taming Asthma, Keefe and Sangermano were honored by The American Red Cross of Rhode Island and Blue Cross & Blue Shield of Rhode Island with the Community Heroes Award.

== Other contributions ==
Keefe helped build and run the Community Boating Center, the Sophia Academy, the Family Life Advocacy Center, Witness for Peace, the Southside Community Land Trust, the Providence Community Library, AIDS Care Ocean State, the Annual Good Friday Walk for Hunger and Homelessness, the Providence Human Relations Commission, the Economic Progress Institute, and the St. Michael's Thanksgiving Mass and free holiday meal.

== Awards ==
- Rhode Island Coalition for the Homeless Carol McGovern, RSM Memorial Award, 1998
- The Goff Women's Achievement Award, 2003
- Lifetime Achievement Award from the Rhode Island Public Health Association, 2008
- The Providence Newspaper Guild's John Kiffney Public Service Award, 2010
- YWCA Rhode Island Women of Achievement Award, 2013
- The Ignatian Volunteer Corps Della Strada Award, 2014

The Sister Ann Keefe Community and Faith Service Award was created by the Rhode Island State Council of Churches (RISCC) and is given annually to individuals and organizations who support and foster nonviolence in the community.

== Death ==
In 2015, Keefe died from brain cancer. On the day of her death, Providence Mayor Jorge Elorza ordered all city flags lowered to half staff in Keefe's honor. She was honored in statements made by Elorza, Nellie Gorbea, Jack Reed, David Cicilline, and Gina Raimondo. Over a thousand people attended Keefe's funeral. Marty Cooper, director of the Community Relations Council of the Jewish Alliance, said, "Governors, senators, congressmen, mayors of great cities and leaders of all faiths respected Sister Ann. She was a Rhode Island icon to be proud of." In May 2015, Congress passed legislation to name the United States Postal Service facility located at 820 Elmwood Avenue in Providence as the “Sister Ann Keefe Post Office.”
