= High–School Streets Historic District =

Historic district in Massachusetts, United States

- U.S. National Register of Historic Places
- U.S. Historic district
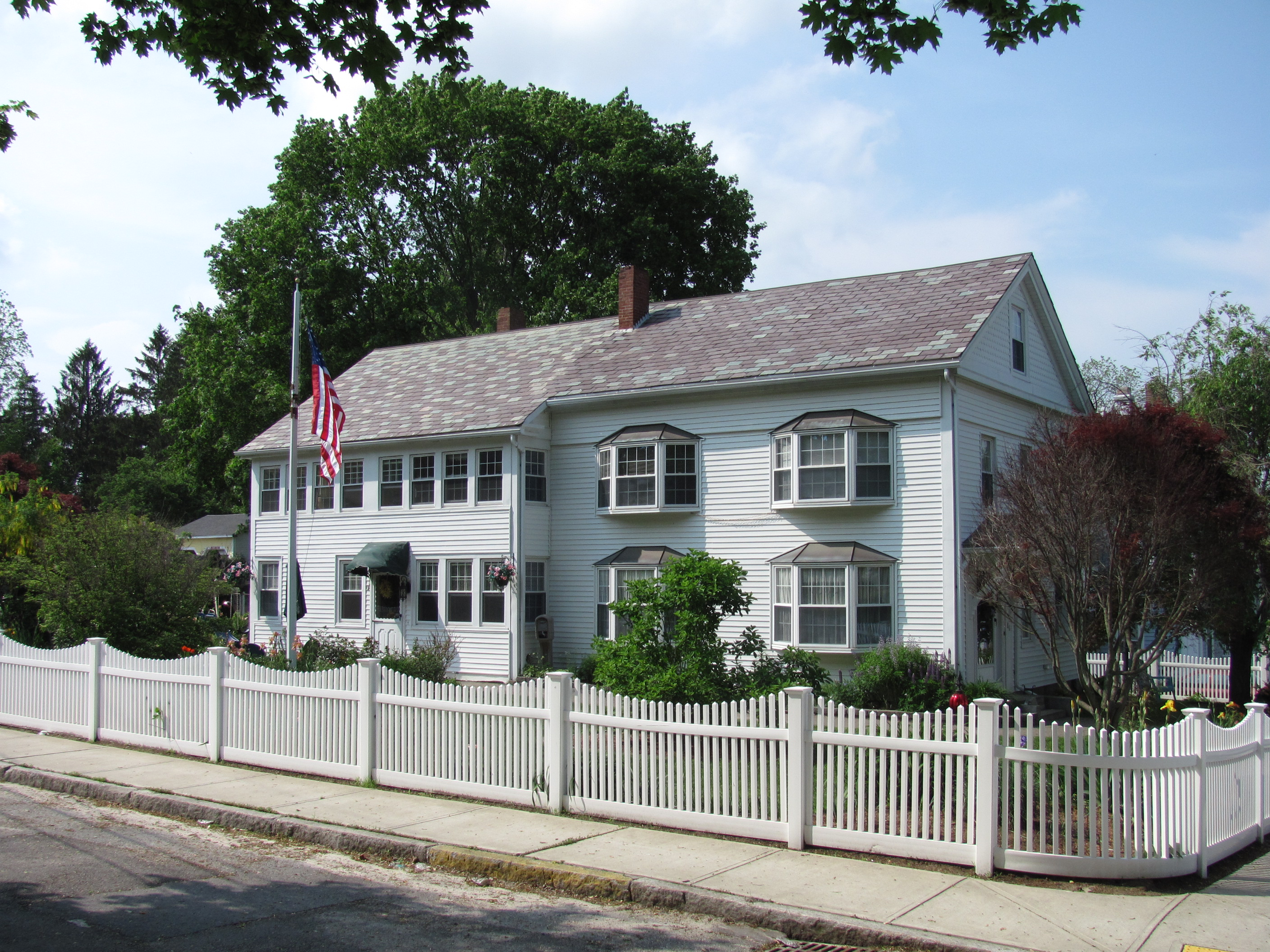
- House at the corner of High and School Streets

- Location within Massachusetts Location within the United States
- Location: High St. at School St., Southbridge, Massachusetts
- Coordinates: 42°4′40″N 72°2′45″W
- Architectural style: Greek Revival
- MPS: Southbridge MRA
- NRHP reference No.: 89000600
- Added to NRHP: June 22, 1989

The High–School Streets Historic District encompasses a cluster of fourteen houses representing one of the best well preserved mid-19th century residential districts in Southbridge, Massachusetts. Located in the city's Globe Village area, the houses are predominantly Greek Revival in style. The district was listed on the National Register of Historic Places in 1989.

== Description and history ==
The Hamilton Woolen Company was established in the 1830s on the north bank of the Quinebaug River northwest of Southbridge's town center. The company owned much land in the area, and in the 1840s began to sell off land along High and School Streets, south of Main Street. These lots were sold with the restriction that houses with a value of at least $1000 be built on them. The result of this was a collection of Greek Revival houses, in a variety of configurations. Most are 1-1/2 to 2-1/2 stories in height, wood frame in construction, and have typical Greek Revival elements, including pilastered corners, entrances with sidelights and/or transoms, with gabled pediments above. Some houses have later 19th-century stylistic elements that were applied after their construction, giving them Italianate or later Victorian flavor. Two houses (26 School and 56 High) in the district are built out of brick.

Most of the houses are on the west side of High Street, extending north from South Street nearly to Main Street. One house stands at the northeast corner of South and High, and two face School Street immediately west of High Street.

== See also ==
- National Register of Historic Places listings in Southbridge, Massachusetts
- National Register of Historic Places listings in Worcester County, Massachusetts
