= Building at 25–27 River Street =

- U.S. National Register of Historic Places
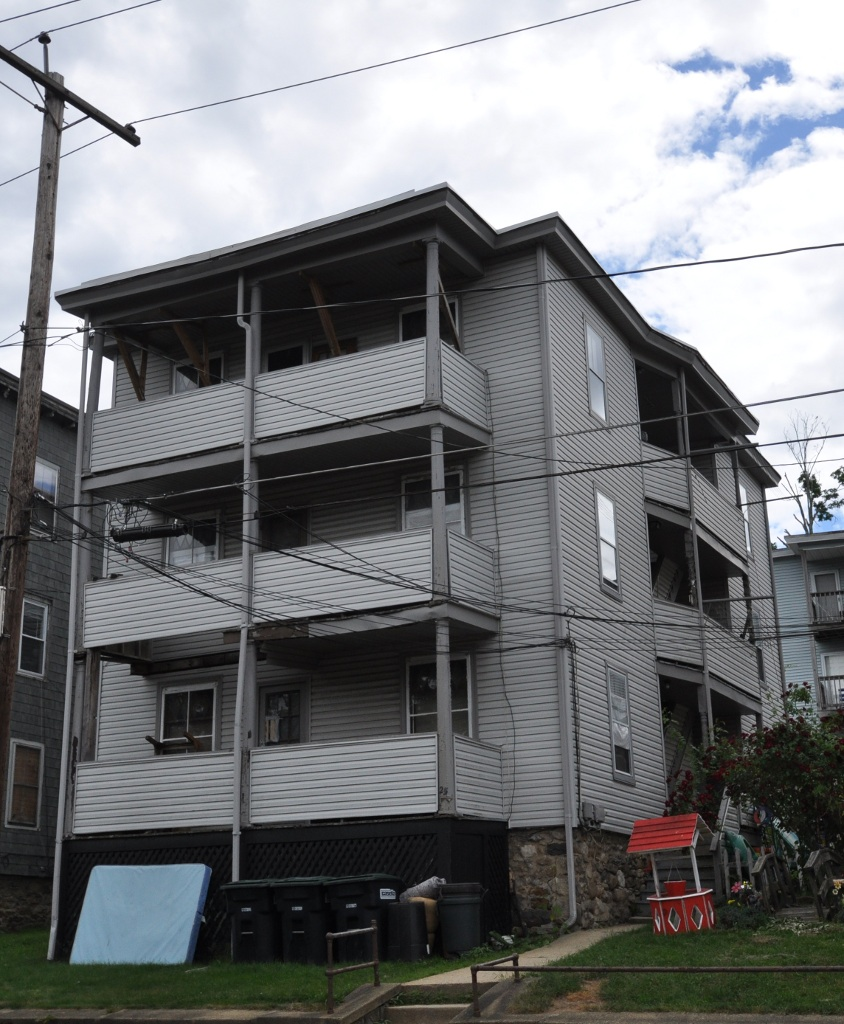

- Location within Massachusetts Location within the United States
- Location: 25–27 River St., Southbridge, Massachusetts
- Coordinates: 42°4′56″N 72°2′21″W
- Area: less than one acre
- Built: 1910
- Architectural style: Vernacular Colonial Revival
- MPS: Southbridge MRA
- NRHP reference No.: 89000574
- Added to NRHP: June 22, 1989

The Building at 25–27 River Street in Southbridge, Massachusetts, is one of two similar triple-deckers built during a housing boom related to the success of the nearby Hamilton Woolen Company. The relatively plain form of these buildings is in contrast to earlier, more ornate styles that preceded their construction. The building was listed on the National Register of Historic Places in 1989.

== Description and history ==
25–27 River Street is located east of the former Hamilton Woolen Company plant, on the south side of River Street between Oliver and Cross Streets. It is a three-story wood frame structure, with a gabled roof and an exterior of modern siding. Its front facade is mostly covered by a three-level porch, each level supported by round columns. The building original had a spindled balustrade, but this has been replaced by sided construction. The main entrance to the building is via a three-level porch on the right side, with outside stairs providing access to the upper floors. The roof is flat, with a projecting but relatively plain cornice.

This building was erected sometime between 1910 and 1920, these years following the construction of the Hamilton Company's "New Mill" across the street. The economic success of the Hamilton Company and its accompanying construction was in contrast to other Massachusetts mill communities, which went into decline during this period. The mill across the street was shuttered in 1935 following a strike. Of six triple deckers built in the 1910s and 1920s on River Street, only it and 29-31 River Street remain.

== See also ==
- National Register of Historic Places listings in Southbridge, Massachusetts
- National Register of Historic Places listings in Worcester County, Massachusetts
