= Building at 52 Main Street =

- U.S. National Register of Historic Places
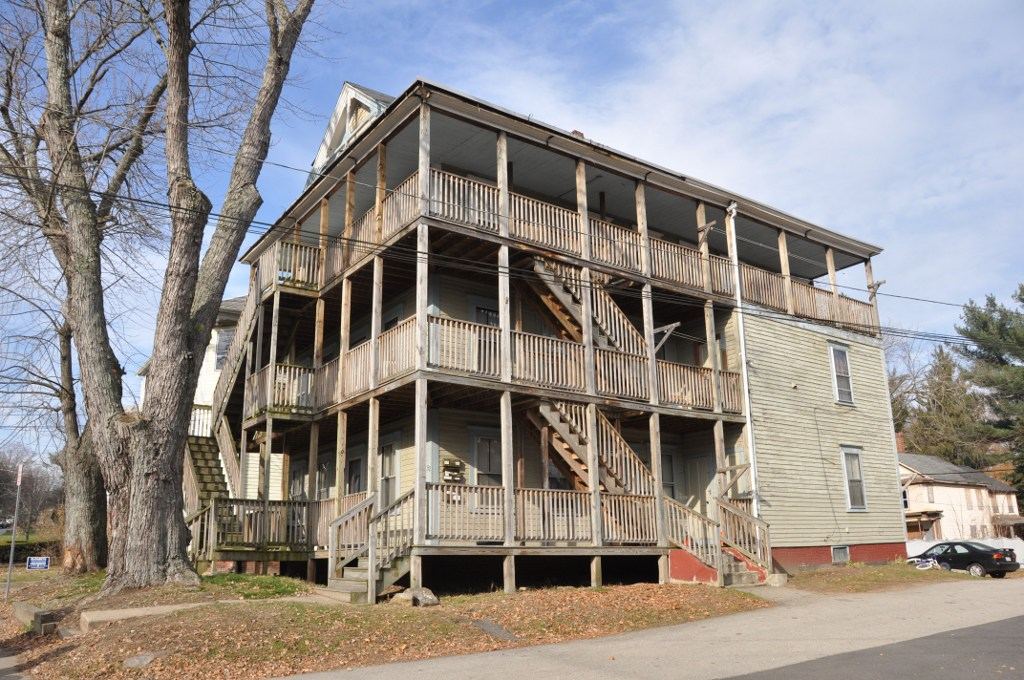

- Location within Massachusetts Location within the United States
- Location: 52 Main St., Southbridge, Massachusetts
- Coordinates: 42°4′24″N 72°1′39″W
- Area: less than one acre
- Built: c. 1904
- Architectural style: Queen Anne
- MPS: Southbridge MRA
- NRHP reference No.: 89000583
- Added to NRHP: June 22, 1989

The Building at 52 Main Street is a historic triple decker residence in Southbridge, Massachusetts. Built early in the 20th century, it is a good example of period worker housing with French Canadian immigrant design features. The house was listed on the National Register of Historic Places in 1989.

== Description and history ==
52 Main Street is located east of downtown Southbridge, on the north side of Main Street between Maple and Crystal Streets. It was built during a housing boom brought about by the success of the nearby American Optical Company, during which larger house lots on Main Street were subdivided and built on with this type of worker housing. In this instance, the present three-story building was built as a replacement for an older two-family residence. This building is of wood frame construction, with a clapboarded exterior and low-pitch gable roof, and is set on a brick foundation. Its network of exterior porches is a locally distinctive feature brought by French Canadian immigrants, wrapping around two sides of the house and sheltering staircases that provide outside access to the upper level residential units. These types of porches are commonly found on surviving triple deckers of the first two decades of the 20th century. The porch railings were originally in the more delicately featured Queen Anne style, with turned posts bracketed at their tops and spindled balusters, but those have been replaced by square posts and balusters.

== See also ==
- National Register of Historic Places listings in Southbridge, Massachusetts
- National Register of Historic Places listings in Worcester County, Massachusetts
