= House at 70–72 Main Street =

Historic house in Massachusetts, United States

- U.S. National Register of Historic Places
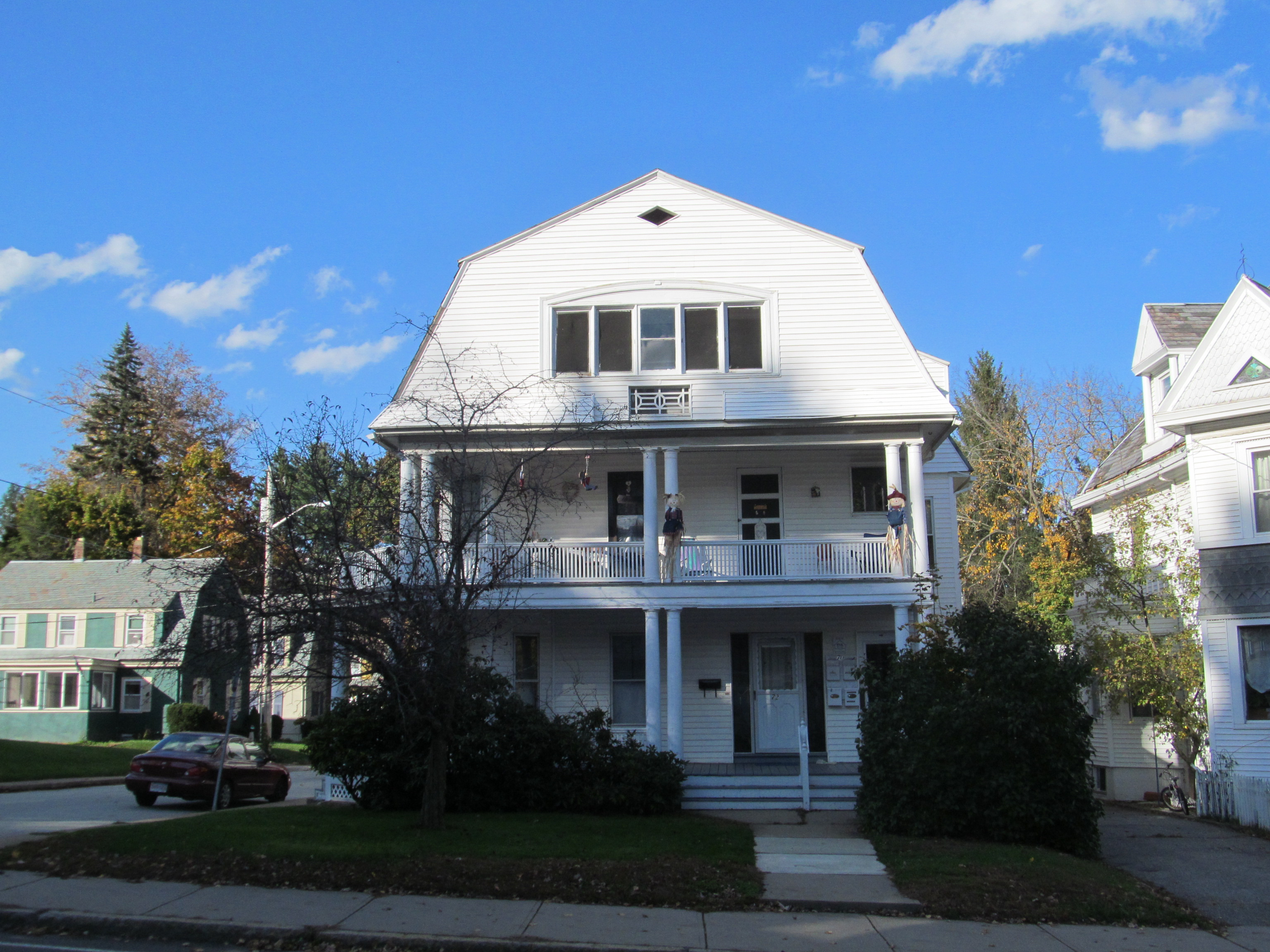

- Location within Massachusetts Location within the United States
- Location: 70–72 Main St., Southbridge, Massachusetts
- Coordinates: 42°4′23″N 72°1′43″W
- Built: 1898
- Architectural style: Colonial Revival
- MPS: Southbridge MRA
- NRHP reference No.: 89000581
- Added to NRHP: June 22, 1989

The house at 70–72 Main Street in Southbridge, Massachusetts was built around the turn of the 20th century for George Wells, president of the American Optical Company, to provide housing for his workers. A gambrel-roofed three family house its gable end faces the street, and is adorned with porches, of which the one on the third floor has since been enclosed. The roof line is pierced by long dormers, giving the third floor unit more space than it might otherwise have. Ownership of the house was eventually transferred to the company, which continued to use the property for worker housing into the 1940s.

The house was listed on the National Register of Historic Places in 1989.

== See also ==
- House at 64 Main Street, built by Wells at about the same time
- National Register of Historic Places listings in Southbridge, Massachusetts
- National Register of Historic Places listings in Worcester County, Massachusetts
