= William Tremblay =

William Tremblay may refer to:

- William Tremblay (writer), American poet and novelist
- William Tremblay (politician), member of the Legislative Assembly of Quebec for Maisonneuve
