= Beyond Investigation Magazine =

Beyond Investigation Magazine (BIM) is a defunct American magazine that features Beyond Investigation, a group that investigates paranormal and conspiracy theory claims. Beyond Investigation was founded by Patrick Wheelock in 2004 to investigate claims of paranormal activity and to publish those investigations and associated research in a printed periodical. Due to the expenses associated with publishing a limit circulation periodical, BIM has changed distribution formats to web and DVD, and only the first issue was distributed in print. In 2005, BIM began webcasting audio programming, most notably a weekly talk show called The Pat & Brian Show.

Beyond Investigation claims to differ from most other paranormal investigative groups in that, although they have worked on occasion with psychics, they make no attempt to purge or explain paranormal activity, they simply attempt to objectively document and analyze data.

In 2006, Beyond Investigation was featured on an episode of Scariest Places on Earth, documenting their paranormal investigation of the USS Hornet (CV-12), a World War II U.S. Navy aircraft carrier turned historical museum.

In 2009, Beyond Investigation was the "employer" chosen for Tiffany Pollard to try her hand as a "ghost hunter" on her VH1 reality television series New York Goes to Work.

== History ==
The periodical Beyond Investigation was founded in 2000. The word "Magazine" was added in 2004 to provide published, consumer oriented, but still scientific research on the paranormal.

The first edition of the magazine recapped some of the investigations done by Pat, Steve, and Chris and introduced more recent members of the BIM team and the investigations done as the larger group. The magazine seemed to also establish a sense of self-deprecating humor with a cover that prominently called Brown "Chris, the scared mortician".

=== Virtual Investigators ===
In 2005, BIM began using a web-based system that allows individuals to observe and ostensibly participate in live investigations. The system is a simple chat client that also displays still captures from various video cameras connected on location. BIM also webcasts live audio from the site and displays real-time temperature data for online participants to monitor. BIM calls an online participant, a "Virtual Paranormal Investigator", or "VPI".

=== Affiliation with the RMS Queen Mary ===
In 2006, BIM conducted its first investigation of the RMS Queen Mary as a sort of "impartial third party" to document and refute some of the claims made on the Sci Fi Channel series Ghost Hunters.

After BIM's first investigation of the Queen Mary, the ship granted unprecedented access to parts of the ship not normally available for such groups and allowed BIM to conduct paranormal investigations on a regular basis.

Since then, the ship and BIM have produced the paranormal exhibition called Ghost Fest Expo.

In 2008, BIM hosted weekly paranormal investigations of the ship, led by Pat Wheelock, where guests can pay to take part in the investigations.

== The Pat & Brian Show ==
The Pat & Brian Show is the weekly webcast talk show featuring Patrick Wheelock and Brian Patton. Their show blends irreverent insult comedy, paranormal news from around the world, listener phone calls, and interviews with guests that have some, usually at least tangential, paranormal connection. The insults are often between and toward Pat and Brian themselves and focus on their body weight and drinking habits. A recurring theme of the show is Brian's lack of political correctness which elicits a response from Pat saying, "Once again, that's Brian at Beyond Investigation dot com".

In 2009, The Pat & Brian Show was "syndicated" on the Haunted Voices Radio Network and has been rebroadcast on Sirius Satellite Radio.

== Ghost Fest Expo ==
In 2006, Beyond Investigation partnered with executive producers Jack Rourke and Erika Frost in conjunction with the RMS Queen Mary to create the first Ghost Fest Expo. The Ghost Fest Expo featured numerous seminars and guest speakers on a range of subjects. Guest speakers have included George Noory, Dr. Andrew Nichols, Jeff Belanger, Loyd Auerbach, and a variety psychics, mediums, authors, and debunkers. The expo also features special tours and investigations of the ship, and a showroom for the sales of paranormal products and services.

On opening day for the first Ghost Fest Expo, George Noory broadcast his show Coast to Coast AM from the Queen Mary.

== See also ==
- Ghost hunting
