= Barbara Stevens (basketball) =

American basketball coach

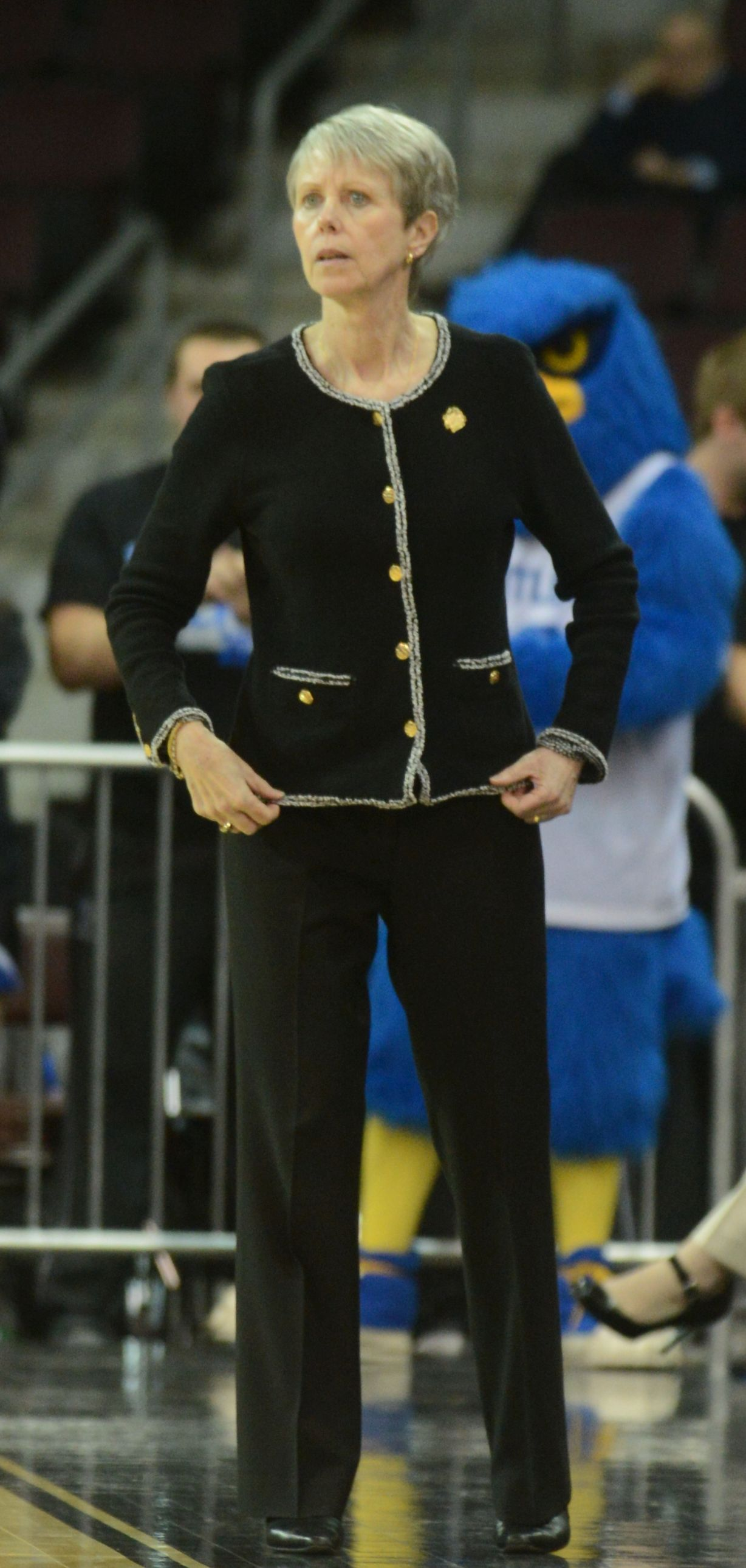
- Stevens in 2014

Biographical details
- Born: September 20, 1954 (age 71); Southbridge, Massachusetts, U.S.

Playing career
- 1972–1976: Bridgewater State

Coaching career (HC unless noted)
- 1976–1977: Clark (MA) (assistant)
- 1977–1983: Clark (MA)
- 1983–1986: UMass
- 1986–2020: Bentley

Head coaching record
- Overall: 1,039–282 (.787)

Accomplishments and honors

Championships
- NCAA Division II National (2014); 17 NE-10 regular season (1988–1994, 1996–2001, 2003, 2011–2013); 4 NE-10 Northeast division (2014, 2016, 2017, 2019); 17 NE-10 Tournament (1990, 1992–1994, 1996, 1998–2001, 2003, 2005, 2011–2014, 2016, 2018)

Awards
- 5× WBCA National Division II Coach of the Year (1992, 1999, 2001, 2013, 2014); 16× NE-10 Coach of the Year (1988, 1989, 1991–1993, 1996–2001, 2003, 2011, 2014, 2017, 2019); Carol Eckman Award (2002)
- Basketball Hall of Fame; Inducted in 2020 (profile)
- Women's Basketball Hall of Fame

Barbara Stevens (born September 20, 1954) is the former head coach of the Bentley University women's basketball team. Stevens had previously served as head basketball coach for Clark University and Massachusetts. Stevens was inducted into the Women's Basketball Hall of Fame in 2006. She was elected to the Naismith Memorial Basketball Hall of Fame in 2020.

In January 2018, Stevens became the fifth women's basketball coach to reach the 1,000 win milestone. Bentley defeated Adelphi University 78–66. Bentley had lost to Adelphi in their last four meetings.

== High school ==
Stevens attended two high schools, Marianhill Central Catholic High School in Southbridge, Massachusetts, then Saint Peter-Marian High School in Worcester, Massachusetts. She played sports, but noted in an article about the history of Title IX, at the time "it was almost embarrassing sometimes to be known as a female athlete".

== College ==
Stevens attended college at Bridgewater State College in Bridgewater, Massachusetts, graduating in 1976. She played on the school basketball team as a point guard, and was named captain. She noted about the experience, "Those of us who were interested in sports did play, but in front of very few people and with very little fanfare and very little notice. How we practiced, the amount of time and what we did to get ready for season are just so different now." In addition to basketball, she also played on the softball team for two years and on the tennis team for two years where she was also named captain.

== Coaching career ==
Stevens started her coaching career as an assistant coach at Clark University in 1976. The school was not known as a solid basketball team but she helped the team win the Massachusetts Association of Intercollegiate Athletics for Women (MAIAW) Division III State Championship. The team record was 14–5. Stevens was named as head coach the following year. She remained the head coach at Clark for six seasons with three MAIAW titles and five postseason appearances. Twice, the team reached the NCAA Division III Final Four. In her final year at Clark she was named the WBCA coach of the year for district 1.

She took over the head coaching duties at Massachusetts in 1983, inheriting a team that had a record of 5–22 in the prior year. Under Stevens leadership, the team improved to 10–17, but they were unable to reach the .500 mark. Despite the modest record, her skills as a coach were recognized. In her final year at Massachusetts, her team played Connecticut, which at the time was not a recognized basketball power. They were coached by Geno Auriemma, who would go on to be named to the Women's Basketball Hall of Fame, the Basketball Hall of Fame, and twice named as the Olympic coach, but at the time he was in his first year as a coach. It was his seventh game as a coach. He noted that Massachusetts had beaten UConn the previous year and they were leading by substantial margin in this game. Then he noticed "something clicked" and the players began applying what they had learned in practice. UConn ended up winning the game 62–59; Auriemma rates it as one of his favorite memories and said of UMass, "they are a good team, well coached by Barbara Stevens. She's great."

Stevens came to Bentley in 1986. Her first year was a good year as the team achieved a record of 24–5. In her second year the team won 28 games. In 1988, her teams started a five-year string of 30 or more victories each year. Between 1992 and 2014, Stevens was named the National Division II Coach of the Year by the Women's Basketball Coaches Association five times in 1992, 1999, 2001, 2013, and 2014.

In 2014, the team went undefeated with a 35–0 record. Bentley reached the national championship game against West Texas A&M. With under six minutes remaining, the team was losing by nine points. One of the players asked the coach if they could go into their full-court pressure defense. Three of the players had four fouls, making such a tactic dangerous but they implemented the press and it was effective. Late in the game, Lauren Battista scored a three-pointer to put the Falcons ahead, then stole the inbounds pass and scored to give Bentley a 65–61 lead to put them ahead for good. The win gave Stevens her first national championship.

== Stevens Court ==
In March 2018, Bentley University made the decision to name the basketball court in the Dana Athletic Center after Stevens. At the naming ceremony, the president of the university, Gloria Cordes Larson said, "Coach Stevens has arguably become one of the top five coaches in the history of all women’s basketball -- and certainly the best ever in NCAA Division II. It’s hard to imagine that anyone will ever come close to replicating the success she and her program have achieved."

== Head coaching record ==
Record table
Season	Team	Overall	Conference	Standing	Postseason
Clark Cougars () (1977–1983)
1977–78	Clark	18–3			
1978–79	Clark	23–5			
1979–80	Clark	21–8			
1980–81	Clark	18–11			
1981–82	Clark	22–7			
1982–83	Clark	21–8			
Clark:		123–42 (.759)			
Massachusetts Minutewomen (Atlantic Ten) (1983–1986)
1983–84	Massachusetts	10–17	3–5	T 6th	
1984–85	Massachusetts	13–15	2–6	T 6th	
1985–86	Massachusetts	11–17	4–12	T 7th	
Massachusetts:		34–49 (.410)	9–23 (.281)		
Bentley Falcons (Northeast–10) (1986–2020)
1986–87	Bentley	24–5	11–3	2nd	
1987–88	Bentley	28–4	17–1	1st	NCAA DII Regional first round
1988–89	Bentley	31–3	18–0	1st	NCAA DII DII National Final Four
1989–90	Bentley	31–4	17–1	1st	NCAA DII National Runner-up
1990–91	Bentley	33–3	18–0	1st	NCAA DII National Final Four
1991–92	Bentley	31–2	18–0	1st	NCAA DII National Final Four
1992–93	Bentley	30–4	16–2	1st	NCAA DII National Final Four
1993–94	Bentley	25–6	16–2	T1st	NCAA DII Regional finals
1994–95	Bentley	22–8	14–4	3rd	NCAA DII Regional semifinals
1995–96	Bentley	28–3	14–2	T1st	NCAA DII Elite Eight
1996–97	Bentley	27–7	17–1	1st	NCAA DII National Final Four
1997–98	Bentley	30–2	19–1	1st	NCAA DII Elite Eight
1998–99	Bentley	32–3	18–0	1st	NCAA DII Elite Eight
1999–00	Bentley	27–4	16–2	1st	NCAA DII Regional finals
2000–01	Bentley	31–3	22–0	1st	NCAA DII Regional finals
2001–02	Bentley	20–9	16–6	3rd	NCAA DII Regional semifinals
2002–03	Bentley	33–3	22–0	1st	NCAA DII National Final Four
2003–04	Bentley	23–8	18–4	2nd	NCAA DII Regional first round
2004–05	Bentley	28–8	17–5	3rd	NCAA DII Regional finals
2005–06	Bentley	20–13	14–8	5th	
2006–07	Bentley	23–8	11–3	T2nd	NCAA DII Regional finals
2007–08	Bentley	19–11	15–7	T3rd	NCAA DII Regional first round
2008–09	Bentley	21–12	15–7	T2nd	NCAA DII Regional first round
2009–10	Bentley	19–11	16–6	T3rd	NCAA DII Regional first round
2010–11	Bentley	28–5	19–3	1st	NCAA DII Elite Eight
2011–12	Bentley	31–4	20–2	1st	NCAA DII National Final Four
2012–13	Bentley	30–2	21–1	1st	NCAA DII Regional Finals
2013–14	Bentley	35–0	21–0	1st	NCAA DII National Champions
2014–15	Bentley	11–16	6–15	7th	
2015–16	Bentley	29–6	16–5	1st	NCAA DII National Final Four
2016–17	Bentley	26–6	20–1	1st	NCAA DII Regional first round
2017–18	Bentley	28–4	18–3	1st	NCAA Div II East Region semifinal
2018–19	Bentley	28–4	20–1	1st	NCAA Div II East Region first round
2019–20	Bentley	19–9	14–5	3rd	
Bentley:		901–200 (.818)	570–101 (.849)		
Total:		1,058–291 (.784)			
National champion Postseason invitational champion Conference regular season champion Conference regular season and conference tournament champion Division regular season champion Division regular season and conference tournament champion Conference tournament champion

== Awards and honors ==
- 1992 WBCA National Coach of the Year (Division II)
- 1999 WBCA National Coach of the Year (Division II)
- 2001 WBCA National Coach of the Year (Division II)
- 2002 Carol Eckman Award
- 2002 New England Basketball Hall of Fame
- 2006 Women's Basketball Hall of Fame
- 2006 Clark University Hall of Fame
- 2013 WBCA National Coach of the Year (Division II)
- 2014 WBCA National Coach of the Year (Division II)

== See also ==
- List of college women's basketball career coaching wins leaders
