= Building at 38–42 Worcester Street =

- U.S. National Register of Historic Places
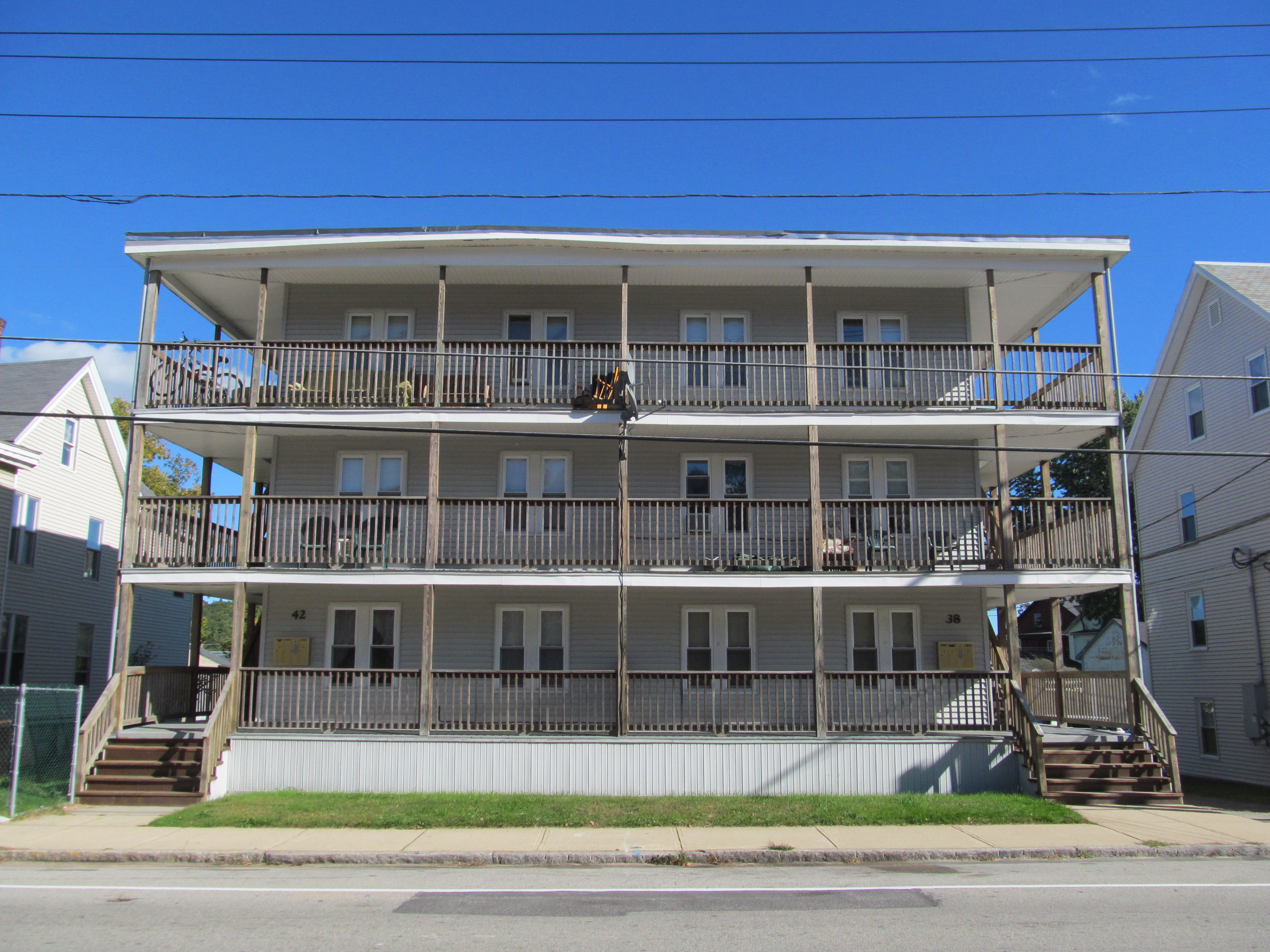

- Location within Massachusetts Location within the United States
- Location: 38–42 Worcester St., Southbridge, Massachusetts
- Coordinates: 42°4′46″N 72°1′47″W
- Area: less than one acre
- Built: c. 1878
- MPS: Southbridge MRA
- NRHP reference No.: 89000589
- Added to NRHP: June 22, 1989

The Building at 38–42 Worcester Street is a historic six-unit triple decker in Southbridge, Massachusetts. Built sometime between 1878 and 1898, it has features influenced by the area's then-growing French Canadian immigrant population, including its outside porches. The building was listed on the National Register of Historic Places in 1989.

== Description and history ==
38–42 Worcester Street is located in the area north of downtown Southbridge known as "The Flats", which was heavily developed beginning in the late 1880s with densely built worker housing. It is a three-story wood frame structure, with a low-pitch roof that extends over a porch that extends across the front and halfway down each side. The porch is accessed via front-facing stairs at either end, and shelters outside stairs that provide access to each of the building's six units. This type of porch is found in other buildings of Southbridge that were built by or for French Canadian immigrants. The original porch had turned posts that gave it a lacy Victorian appearance, a detail that has since been lost.

The house was built sometime between 1878 and 1898, when development of The Flats was begun to provide additional housing for workers at the American Optical Company, one of Southbridge's leading employers. By 1898 the area had several clusters of closely built three-deckers, of which this was one. In the early years of the 20th century, the area was developed more intensively, filling in the gaps with more three-deckers. Of the ones built during the first phase of development, this one is the best preserved.

== See also ==
- National Register of Historic Places listings in Southbridge, Massachusetts
- National Register of Historic Places listings in Worcester County, Massachusetts
