= A. Kinney House =

Historic house in Massachusetts, United States

- U.S. National Register of Historic Places
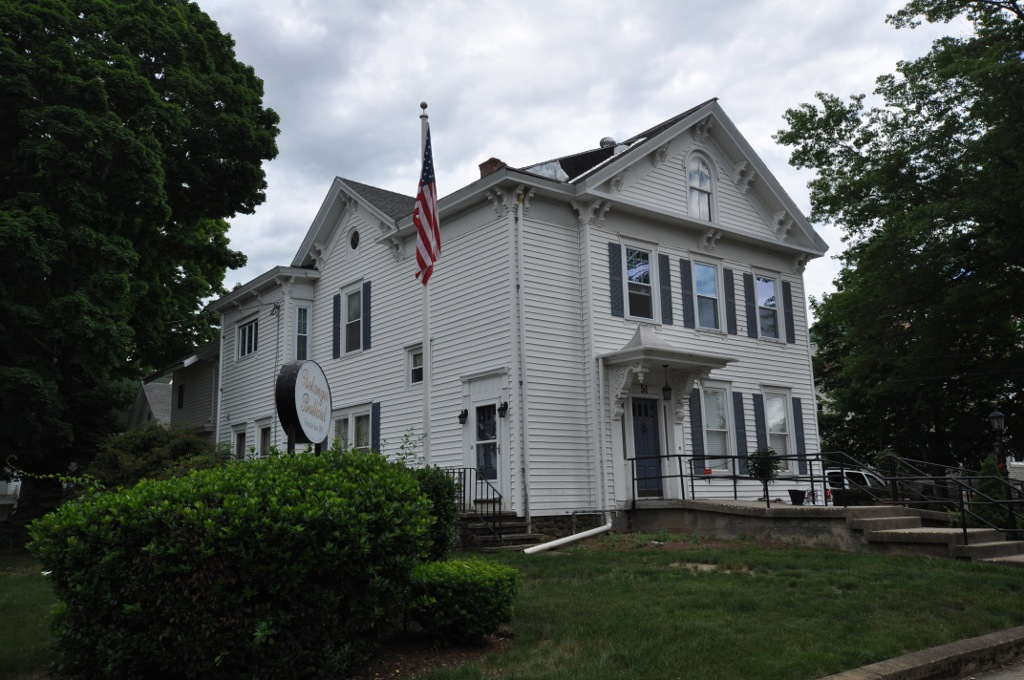

- Location within Massachusetts
- Location: 42 Edwards St., Southbridge, Massachusetts
- Coordinates: 42.0789°N 72.0367°W
- Built: 1865
- Architectural style: Greek Revival, Italianate
- MPS: Southbridge MRA
- NRHP reference No.: 89000565
- Added to NRHP: June 22, 1989

The A. Kinney House is a historic house located in Southbridge, Massachusetts.

== Description and history ==
It is an excellent local example of a mid 19th century house with transitional Greek Revival and Italianate styling. Its basic form, a three wide, side hall layout, is classically Greek Revival, but its exterior includes Italianate details such as round-arch gable windows and bracketing in the cornice, gable and porch areas. Nothing is known of its owner, identified on period maps as A. Kinney.

The house was listed on the National Register of Historic Places in 1989. It now houses a funeral home.

== See also ==
- National Register of Historic Places listings in Southbridge, Massachusetts
- National Register of Historic Places listings in Worcester County, Massachusetts
