= Sylvester Dresser House =

Historic house in Massachusetts, United States

- U.S. National Register of Historic Places
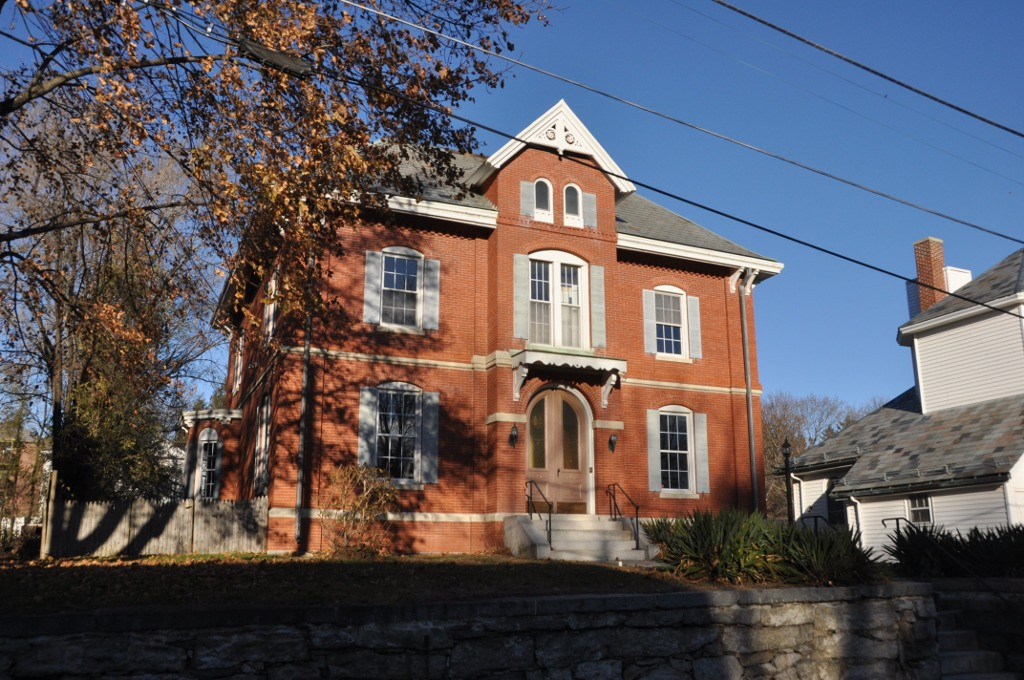

- Location within Massachusetts Location within the United States
- Location: 29 Summer St., Southbridge, Massachusetts
- Coordinates: 42°4′18″N 72°2′5″W
- Area: 1 acre (0.40 ha)
- Built: c. 1870
- Architectural style: Gothic, Italianate
- MPS: Southbridge MRA
- NRHP reference No.: 89000523
- Added to NRHP: June 22, 1989

The Sylvester Dresser House is a historic house at 29 Summer Street in Southbridge, Massachusetts. Built sometime between 1865 and 1870, it is a distinctive local example of Italianate architecture with some Gothic features. It was listed on the National Register of Historic Places in 1989.

== Description and history ==
The Sylvester Dresser House is located in a residential area just south of downtown Southbridge, on the north side of Summer Street. It is a 2-1/2 brick structure in a strong Italianate form, with a truncated hip roof. The blocky form with three bays, with the rounded arch entry and heavy balcony, are typical Italianate features, but the steeply pitched roof lines and Stick style decorative elements are more distinctly Gothic. The choice of brick as a building material is locally somewhat unusual, but not unexpected given that its builder owned brickyards at the time of its construction.

The house was built between 1865 and 1870 for Sylvester Dresser, a leading businessman in Southbridge during the second half of the 19th century. Dresser began his career as a schoolteacher, but operated a variety of businesses between the 1840s and 1860s. In 1865 he began operating a brickyard, eventually owning three in Southbridge and neighboring Dudley. He was notable for making the first shipment (a load of bricks) when the railroad arrived in Southbridge in 1866. He was also active in civic affairs, serving in a variety of public posts for the city.

== See also ==
- National Register of Historic Places listings in Southbridge, Massachusetts
- National Register of Historic Places listings in Worcester County, Massachusetts
