= House at 64 Main Street =

Historic house in Massachusetts, United States

- U.S. National Register of Historic Places
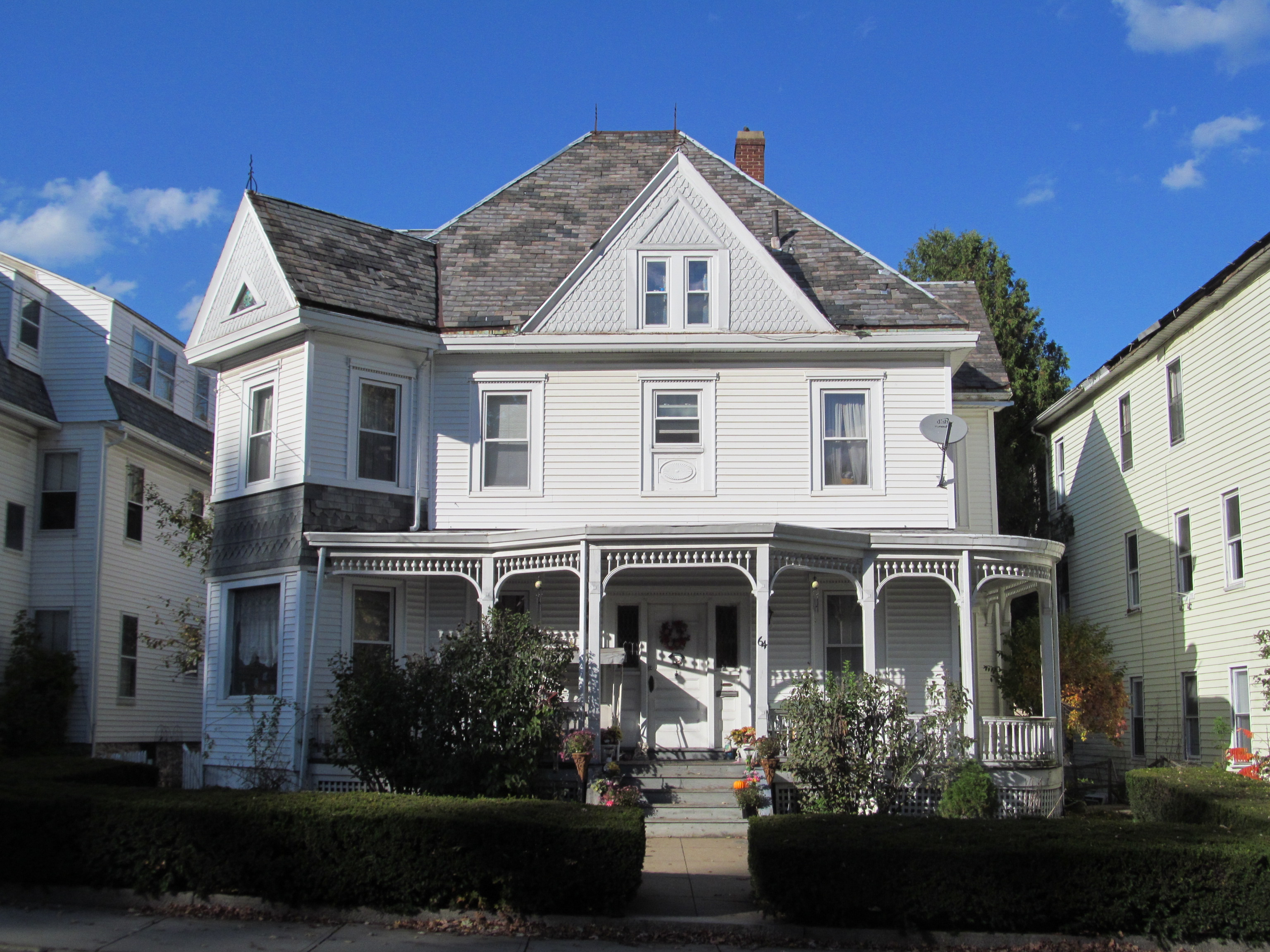

- Location within Massachusetts Location within the United States
- Location: 64 Main St., Southbridge, Massachusetts
- Coordinates: 42°4′23″N 72°1′41″W
- Built: 1898
- Architectural style: Queen Anne, Vernacular Queen Anne
- MPS: Southbridge MRA
- NRHP reference No.: 89000582
- Added to NRHP: June 22, 1989

The house at 64 Main Street in Southbridge, Massachusetts is a vernacular Queen Anne Victorian house built around the turn of the 20th century. It was built for George Wells, president of the American Optical Company, as a property to rent to factory workers. Its styling includes a wraparound porch, and diamond-pattern shingles in the gable end, as well as patternwork in the slate roof. However, it also has some Colonial Revival details, including the window treatments and the front door surround.

The house was listed on the National Register of Historic Places in 1989.

== See also ==
- House at 70–72 Main Street, an adjacent worker house also built by Wells
- National Register of Historic Places listings in Southbridge, Massachusetts
- National Register of Historic Places listings in Worcester County, Massachusetts
