= Michael Earls =

American Jesuit

Michael Earls, S.J. (1875–1937) was a Jesuit priest, as well as a writer, poet, teacher, and administrator.

== Life ==
The eldest of ten children, he was born in 1875 to Irish immigrant parents, Martin Earls and Mary (Shaughnessy) Earls, in Southbridge, Massachusetts, a manufacturing town in south, central Massachusetts.

He attended school in Southbridge and later prepared for college at Memramcook, near St. John's New Brunswick. He entered the College of the Holy Cross in Worcester, Mass. in 1893, beginning what would be a long association with one of the first Catholic colleges in the U.S., graduating with an A.B.

He studied literature at Georgetown University from 1896 to 1897, earning an MA and then served as a tutor on a trip to Europe, after which, in 1898, he entered the Grand Seminary at Montreal, Canada.

He later decided to attend the Jesuit novitiate at Frederick, Maryland. He taught at Boston College High School, was affiliated with the school literary magazine, and produced a play. He returned to Woodstock and was ordained in 1912.

He was Professor of Rhetoric at Holy Cross from 1916 to 1926, Father Minister of the community from 1926 to 1929, and taught English from 1929 to 1931. In addition to these academic roles, he also held a number of other church positions, including parish priest at St. Mary's in Boston's North End from 1933 to 1935.

Over the course of his life, he was frequently drawn to leading literary figures and counted among his friends and correspondents Louise Imogen Guiney, Joyce Kilmer, and G. K. Chesterton.

As director of the Holy Cross Alumni Association, he was struck by a heart attack in New York City while boarding a train to Cleveland. He died at St. Vincent's hospital on January 31, 1937.

He is memorialized by a stained glass window at the Dinand Library of Holy Cross College.

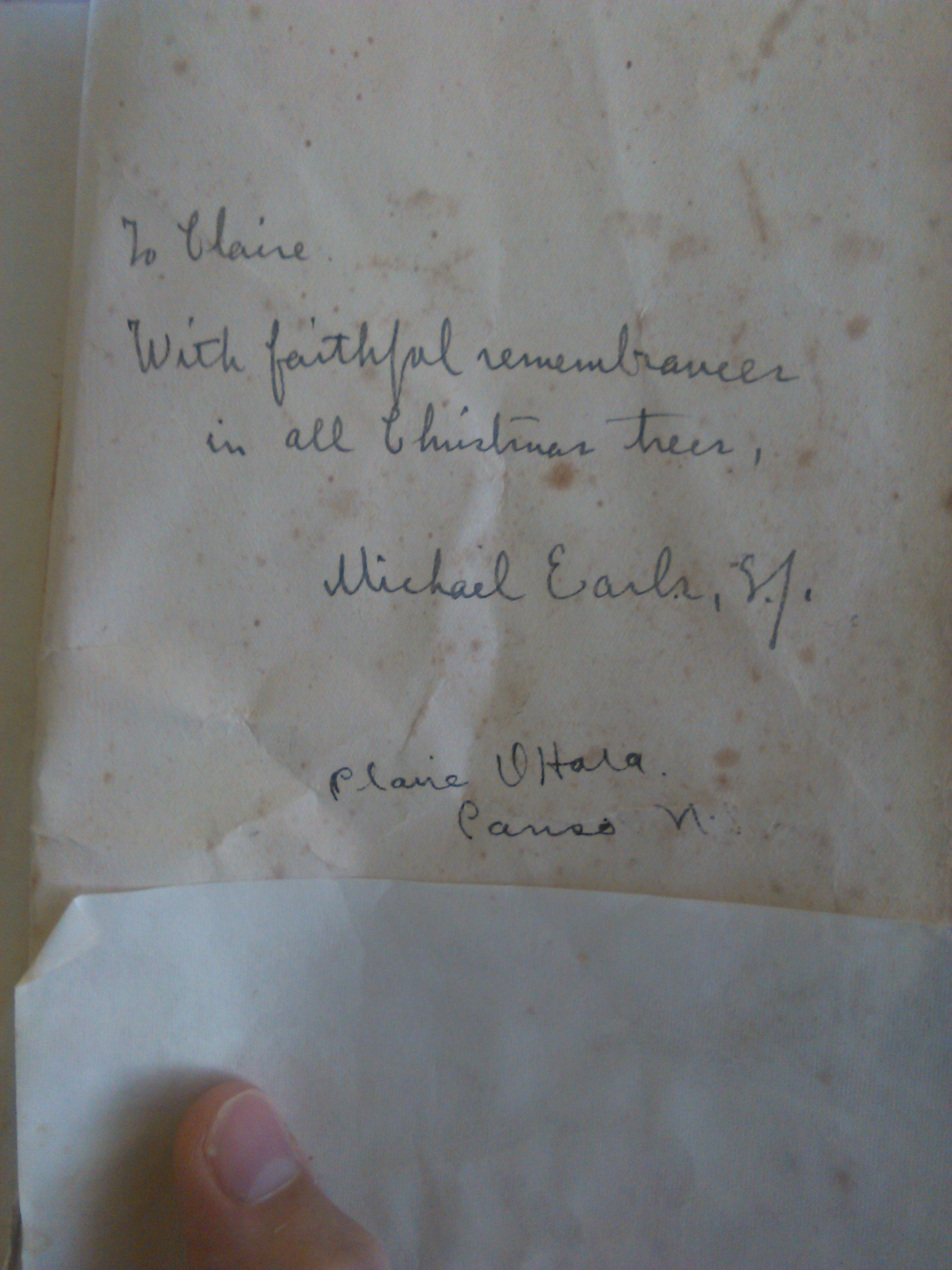
Michael Earls original signed copy

== Works ==
=== Poetry ===
- The Hosting of the King
- The Road Beyond the Town (1912)
- Ballads of Childhood
- Ballads of Peace in War
- From Bersabee to Dan
- In the Abbey of the Woods

=== Short stories ===
- Melchior of Boston
- Stuore

=== Novels ===
- Wedding Bells of Glendalough
- Marie of the House d`Anters

=== Essays ===
- Under College Towers
- Manuscripts and Memories
