= Winthrop D. Putnam =

- Born: September 18, 1837; Southbridge, Massachusetts, US
- Died: January 15, 1907 (aged 69)
- Burial place: Milwaukee, Wisconsin, US
- Military career
- Allegiance: United States of America
- Branch: United States Army
- Rank: Corporal
- Units: Company A, 77th Illinois Infantry
- Conflicts: Battle of Vicksburg; American Civil War
- Awards: Medal of Honor

Winthrop D. Putnam (September 18, 1837 – January 15, 1907) was an American soldier who fought in the American Civil War. Putnam received the United States' highest award for bravery during combat, the Medal of Honor. Putnam's medal was won for his actions at the Battle of Vicksburg, Mississippi on July 2, 1863. He was honored with the award on April 4, 1898.

Putnam was born in Southbridge, Massachusetts, entered service in Peoria, Illinois, and was buried in Milwaukee, Wisconsin.

== Medal of Honor citation ==
The President of the United States of America, in the name of Congress, takes pleasure in presenting the Medal of Honor to Corporal Winthrop D. Putnam, United States Army, for extraordinary heroism on 22nd May 1863, while serving with Company A, 77th Illinois Infantry, in action at Vicksburg, Mississippi. Corporal Putnam carried, with others, by hand, a cannon up to and fired it through an embrasure of the enemy's works.

== See also ==
- List of American Civil War Medal of Honor recipients: M–P
