= St. Michael's Roman Catholic Church, Convent, Rectory, and School =

Historic church in Rhode Island, United States

- U.S. National Register of Historic Places
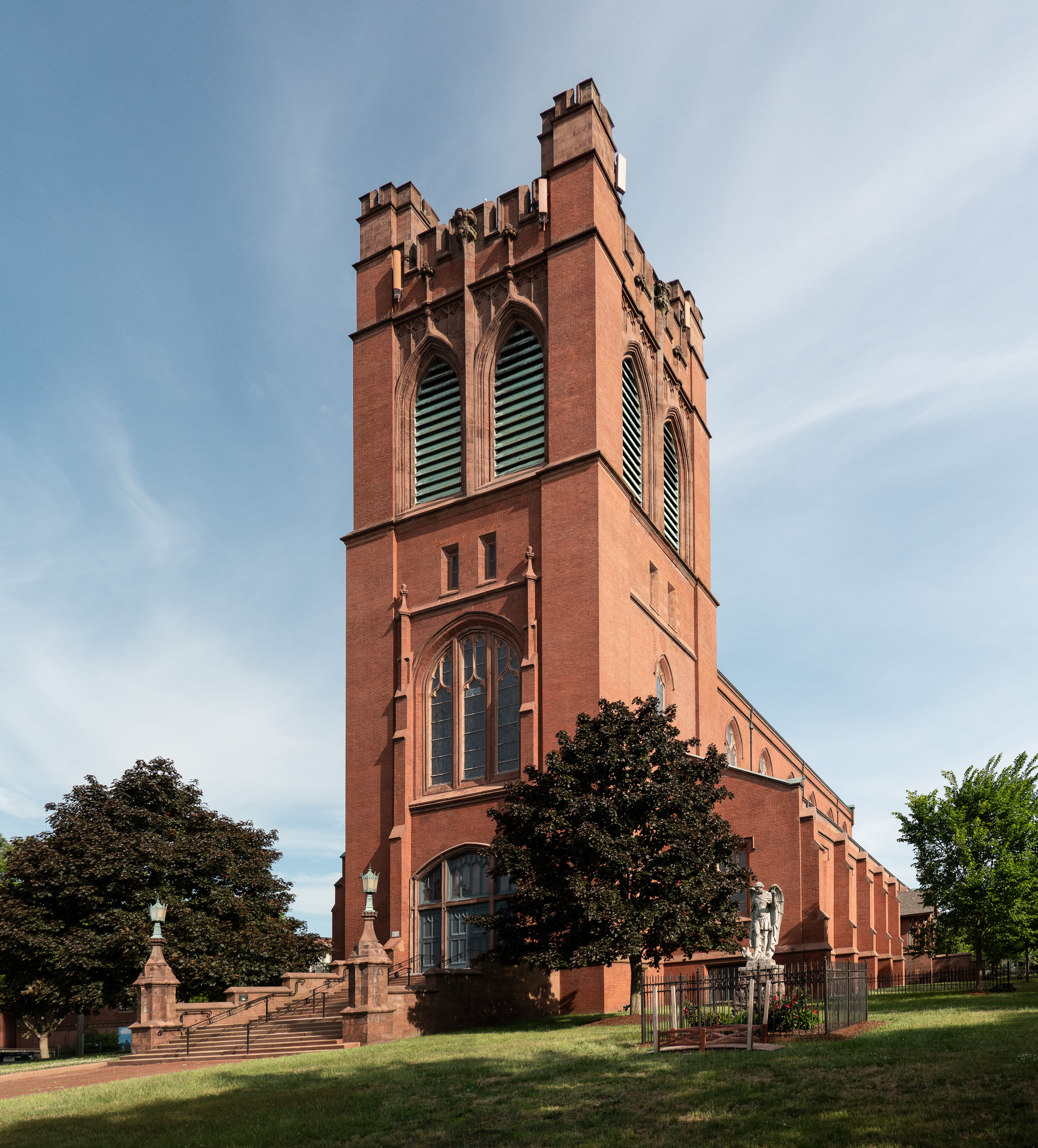

- Location within Rhode Island Location within the United States
- Location: 239 Oxford St, Providence, Rhode Island
- Coordinates: 41°48′06″N 71°24′52″W
- Architects: Martin & Hall; Ambrose J. Murphy
- Architectural style: Late Gothic Revival
- Website: www.saintmichaelprovidence.org/static.html
- NRHP reference No.: 77000006
- Added to NRHP: March 25, 1977

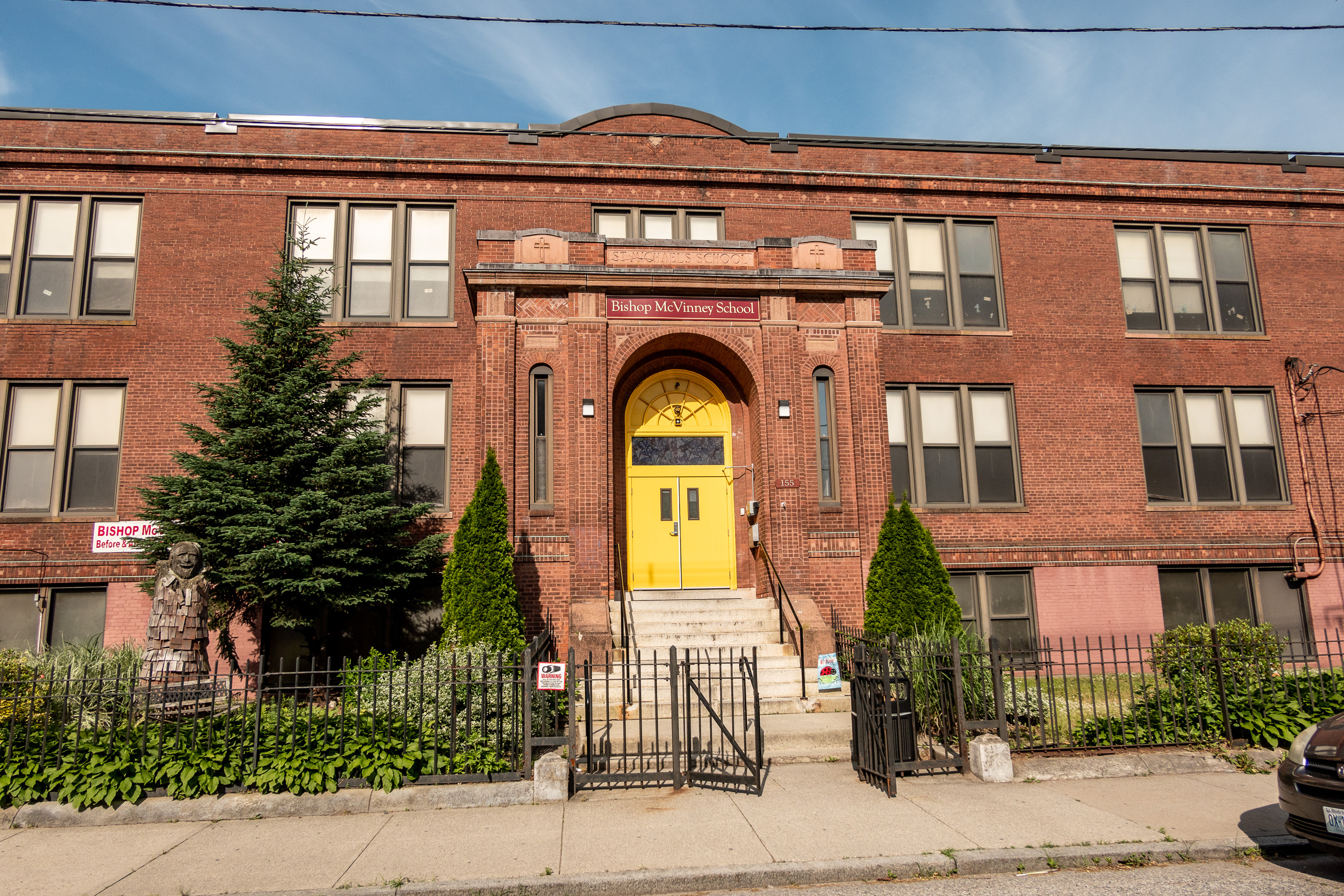
The former parish school, now the regional Bishop McVinney School

St. Michael's Roman Catholic Church is a historic Roman Catholic church in the Lower South Providence neighborhood of Providence, Rhode Island. It is a parish of the Roman Catholic Diocese of Providence. The church complex has been listed on the United States National Register of Historic Places as St. Michael's Roman Catholic Church, Convent, Rectory, and School.

== Early parish history ==
The parish of St. Michael the Archangel was first organized as a mission of the cathedral parish in 1857. The congregation first occupied a disused Baptist church which was rededicated to Saint Bernard of Clairvaux. The mission became a separate parish in 1859; it was the first Catholic parish established in what was then the town of Cranston (South Providence was annexed to Providence in 1868). Construction of a permanent brick church at the corner of Prairie Avenue and Oxford Street was begun in October 1867 to designs by James Murphy. The church was dedicated by Bishop Francis Patrick McFarland in November 1868; at that time the church was renamed for Saint Michael. A rectory was completed in 1877. In 1892 Rev. Joseph F. McDonough was appointed pastor of the parish. By this time the parish had grown substantially and Rev. McDonough quickly made the construction of a new church a priority. It would take over twenty years for the church to become reality.

== Church history and architecture ==
The main church building is a large structure of red brick with red-sandstone trim. After several false starts the cornerstone was laid in June 1901 by Bishop Matthew Harkins. The architects were Martin & Hall and the contractor was M. J. Houlihan. According to Rev. McDonough the style chosen was Perpendicular Gothic with King's College Chapel, Cambridge, as a primary inspiration. In 1903 the church was structurally complete but construction soon stalled. Rev. McDonough died in March 1906 and in April his successor, Rev. J. C. Walsh, made plans to complete the building. The contract with Martin & Hall was terminated and Murphy & Hindle, who specialized in church design, were retained to prepare the basement of the church as a chapel. In September Bishop Harkins dedicated the new lower chapel to St. Bernard.

The project to complete the upper church did not move forward until later. When it did the reorganized Murphy, Hindle & Wright were retained as architects. The completed interior, which included an extensive program of stained glass by Hardman of Birmingham, was dedicated by Bishop Harkins in October 1915. The church's bells were installed in 1939; they were dedicated in a rare local instance of the "baptism of bells" by Bishop Francis Patrick Keough. Ambrose J. Murphy, senior partner of Murphy, Hindle & Wright, was responsible for the later parish buildings. The rectory and parish school, facing Oxford Street and Gordon Avenue, respectively, were completed in 1925. The final building, the convent, was completed at the corner of Oxford Street and Gordon Avenue in 1929. Whereas Murphy had used other styles for the rectory and school, the convent was designed in a picturesque Gothic style complementary to the church. The convent was enlarged in 1957; since 1975 it has been used for other purposes. The last change to the parish complex was the destruction of the old church, which had been used as a parish hall, by fire in 1969.

Providence architectural historian Mack Woodward described the church as a "bold, proud architectural statement" and observed that "like so much turn-of-the-century revivalist architecture, it far outstrips its inspiration in size and scale."

== Later parish history ==
In the 1960s, the neighborhood transformed as white residents moved away to the suburbs and newcomers of various ethnicities moved in. In the 1970s, St. Michael's became known as a multicultural parish which supported progressive organizations and policies. Social justice activist Sister Ann Keefe and members of the church helped found various progressive causes and hosted meetings for progressive organizations. As more immigrants arrived, the church hosted masses in English, Hmong, Spanish, Haitian Creole and Kirundi. The church welcomed Catholics who disagreed with the Church’s teachings on issues such as gay rights and abortion.

In 2020 Sister Joyce Flowers and pastor Father Robert Paul Perron died, and the church was put under new, more conservative, leadership. Many congregants saw the new leadership as less inclusive and lacking the previous commitment to social justice. In 2023 the Providence Journal reported that "at least 100 people have left St. Michael’s since 2020".

The parish complex was listed on the National Register of Historic Places in 1977.

== See also ==
- Catholic Church in the United States
- Catholic parish church
- Index of Catholic Church articles
- National Register of Historic Places listings in Providence, Rhode Island
