= Center of Hope Foundation =

Non-profit agency in Massachusetts, US

Center of Hope Foundation, Inc.
- Formation: May 1956
- Founder: Anita Anderson
- Purpose: Vocational rehabilitation for disabled persons
- Location: Southbridge, Massachusetts
- Region served: Central Massachusetts and portion of Connecticut
- Website: thecenterofhope.org

The Center of Hope Foundation is a non-profit agency based in Southbridge, Massachusetts. The Center of Hope has been offering services to adults and children with cognitive and developmental disabilities since 1956, and began to offer client housing in 2006. The adults and children who use the center experience personal growth, skills building, friendship, and community membership. The center wants each individual to achieve his or her greatest level of independence. The center offers many programs to service individual needs. The difference day programs are West Street Day Habilitation Program, Southbridge Day Habilitation Program, Quinebaug River Day Habilitation Program, and Center of Hope Day Habilitation Program. These opportunities for the individuals are both paid and voluntary jobs. It operates a number of businesses which its clients work in, such as a car detailing service and Books and Beans, a coffee shop.

In 2006, the Center of Hope began the construction of a building in Brookfield, Massachusetts, to serve clients there.
