= Jeff Belanger =

American paranormal investigator

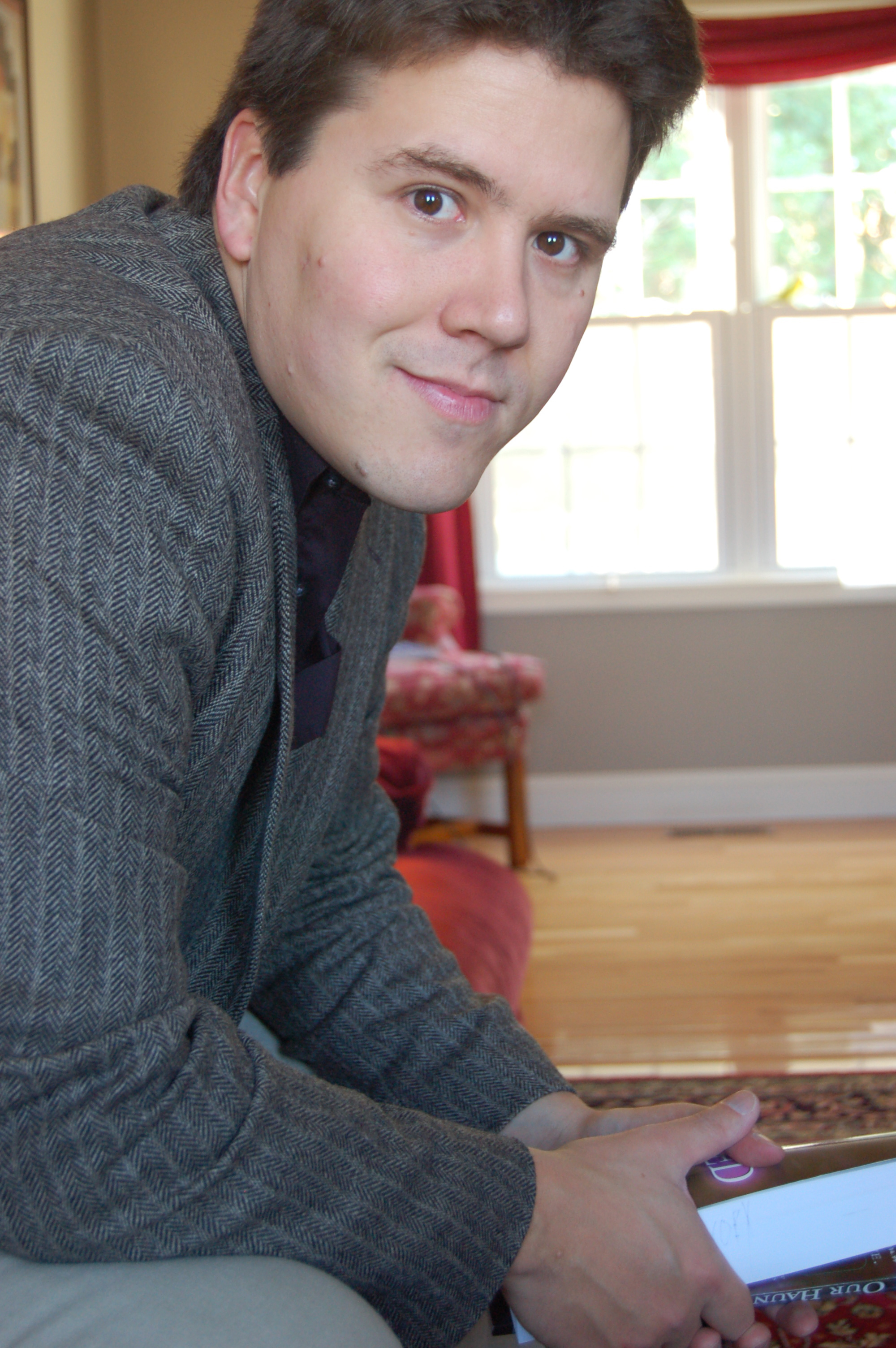
- Born: August 8, 1974 (age 52); Southbridge, Massachusetts
- Occupation: Paranormal investigator
- Spouse: Megan
- Children: Sophie
- Website: Jeff Belanger, exploring the unexplained

Jeff Belanger (born August 8, 1974) is an American writer who focuses on the paranormal. He hosts the Emmy-nominated series New England Legends and co-hosts, with Ray Auger, the New England Legends podcast. He is a writer and researcher for Ghost Adventures and has appeared on several episodes. Paranormal researcher Ben Radford calls Belanger a "ghost storyteller" rather than a "ghost investigator." In 2021, Belanger published a book about his experience reaching the summit of Mount Kilimanjaro in Africa.

== Education and career ==
Jeff Belanger graduated from Hofstra University with a B.A. in English. After college he was editor-in-chief of Main Street, a biweekly arts and entertainment newspaper in northern Fairfield County, Connecticut. He previously worked in marketing and public relations and is now a full-time writer and storyteller living in Massachusetts.

== Paranormal research ==
Paranormal researcher Ben Radford criticized Belanger's book Communicating with the Dead; he calls attention to Belanger mentioning the Fox sisters '"spirit rapping"' in the introduction of his book, but "seems unaware of the fact that the sisters admitted that they had faked these ghostly communications. This is a curious oversight for such a self-professed expert."

== Bibliography ==
- The World’s Most Haunted Places: Updated and Revised by Jeff Belanger (New Page Books, September 2026) ISBN 1-63748-024-5
- Wicked Strange: Your Guide to Ghosts, Monsters, Oddities, and Urban Legends from New England by Jeff Belanger (author) and Frank Grace (photographer) (New Page Books, September 2025) ISBN 1-63748-021-0
- The Fright Before Christmas: Surviving Krampus and Other Yuletide Monsters by Jeff Belanger (New Page Books, September 2023) ISBN 1-63748-015-6
- The Call of Kilimanjaro: Finding Hope Above the Clouds by Jeff Belanger (Imagine, March 2021) ISBN 1-62354-511-0
- 2014 Haunted New England Wall Calendar by Jeff Belanger with photography by Frank Grace (Tide-mark, August 2013) ISBN 1-59490-901-6
- Chasing Spirits: The Building of the Ghost Adventures Crew by Nick Groff with Jeff Belanger (Penguin/NAL, October 2012) ISBN 0-45141-344-X
- What It's Like to Climb Mount Everest, Blast Off into Space, Survive a Tornado, and Other Extraordinary Stories (Sterling, March 2011) ISBN 1-4027-6711-0
- Picture Yourself Legend Tripping: Your Complete Guide to Finding UFOs, Monsters, Ghosts, and Urban Legends in Your Own Backyard (Course Technology PTR, June 2010) ISBN 1-4354-5639-4
- The Mysteries of the Bermuda Triangle (Grosset and Dunlap, February 2010) ISBN 0-448-45227-8
- Who's Haunting the White House? The President's Mansion and the Ghosts Who Live There (Sterling, September 2008) ISBN 1-4027-3822-6
- Weird Massachusetts: Your Travel Guide to the Massachusetts' Local Legends and Best Kept Secrets (Sterling, May 2008) ISBN 1-4027-5437-X
- The Ghost Files: Paranormal Encounters, Discussion, and Research from the Vaults of Ghostvillage.com (New Page Books, September 2007) ISBN 1-56414-974-9
- Ghosts of War: Restless Spirits of Soldiers, Spies, and Saboteurs (New Page Books, September 2006) ISBN 1-56414-889-0
- Our Haunted Lives: True Life Ghost Encounters (New Page Books, July 2006) ISBN 1-56414-856-4
- The Nightmare Encyclopedia: Your Darkest Dreams Interpreted (New Page Books, November 2005) ISBN 1-56414-762-2
- Encyclopedia of Haunted Places: Ghostly Locales From Around the World (New Page Books, August 2005) ISBN 1-56414-799-1
- Communicating With the Dead: Reach Beyond the Grave (New Page Books, April 2005)
- The World's Most Haunted Places: From the Secret Files of Ghostvillage.com (New Page Books, August 2004) ISBN 1-56414-793-2
