= Southside Community Land Trust =

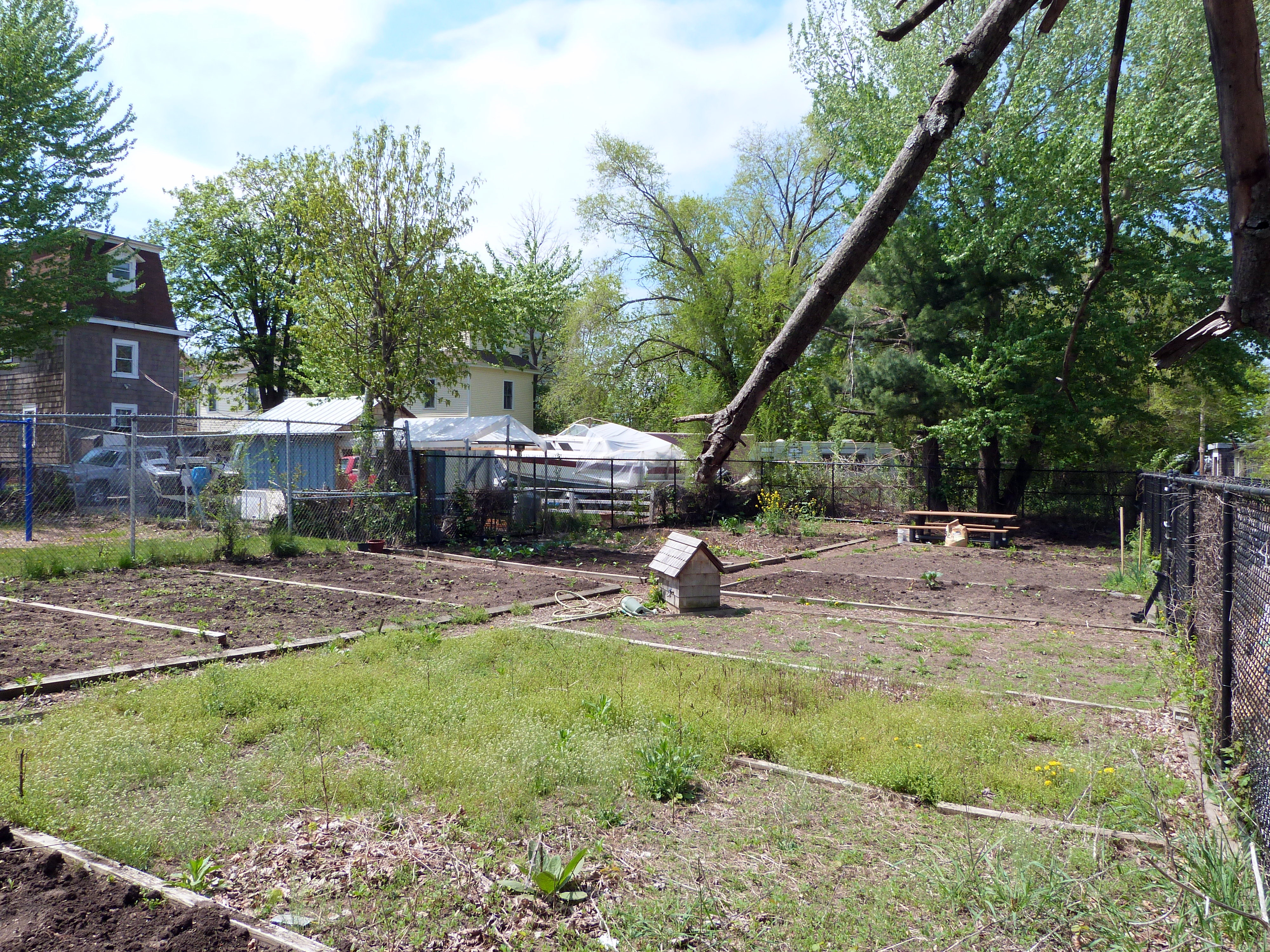
The Janes Community Garden, a project of the Southside Community Land Trust

Southside Community Land Trust is a 501(c)(3) non-profit organization located in Providence, Rhode Island, with a mission to provide access to land, education and other resources necessary for people in the Greater Providence area to grow food in environmentally sustainable ways as a means of creating a food system where locally produced, affordable and nutritious food is available to all. It was established in 1981. In 2019 the trust obtained $600,000 in funding to assist urban farmers.
