= Blue Cross & Blue Shield of Rhode Island Headquarters =

Coordinates: 41.828258°N 71.413242°W

Blue Cross and Blue Shield of Rhode Island Headquarters
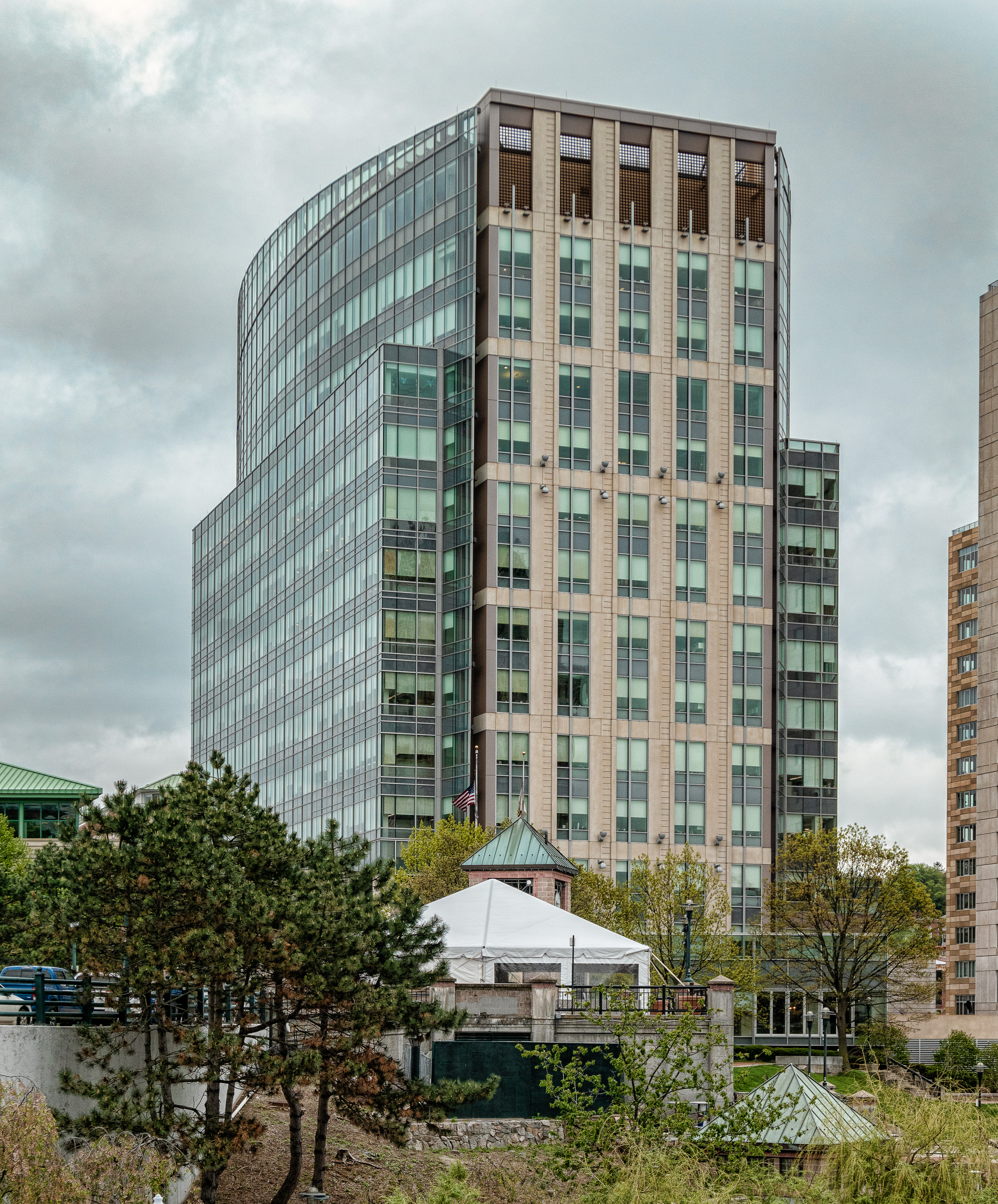
- Interactive map of the Blue Cross and Blue Shield of Rhode Island Headquarters area

General information
- Location: Providence, RI 02903, United States
- Construction started: 2008
- Completed: 2009

Height
- Roof: 237 ft (72 m)

Technical details
- Floor count: 13
- Floor area: 325,000 sq ft (30,200 m^{2})

Design and construction
- Architects: Symmes Maini & McKee Associates

The Blue Cross & Blue Shield of Rhode Island Headquarters is a LEED Certified high-rise in downtown Providence, Rhode Island.

== Location ==
The building is sited immediately north of the two Waterplace Towers, at the intersection of American Express Plaza and Exchange Street. At a height of 237 ft (72 m), it is currently the seventh-tallest building in the city and state.

== Purpose ==
The public health insurer announced April 19, 2007, its intention to consolidate its operations comprising 1100 employees, which had been scattered throughout the city, into one 325,000 sq ft (30,200 m^{2}) 12-story building. The $114 million tower will be built on top of a parking garage currently under construction for Intercontinental's neighboring Waterplace condominiums, and is estimated to be finished by early 2010. The economic feasibility of this move is made possible through $25 million worth of tax breaks negotiated with Intercontinental.

== Opinion ==
Mayor David Cicilline was optimistic at the prospect of retaining the 1100 employees in the city adding to the "economy and add to the life and vitality of our city", while the state's governor, Donald Carcieri, worried about the impact a move to occupy such expensive real estate would have on the premiums for the insurer's customers, since the first priority of the Blue Cross & Blue Shield should be the affordable coverage of citizens.

== Gallery ==
3D render of the site

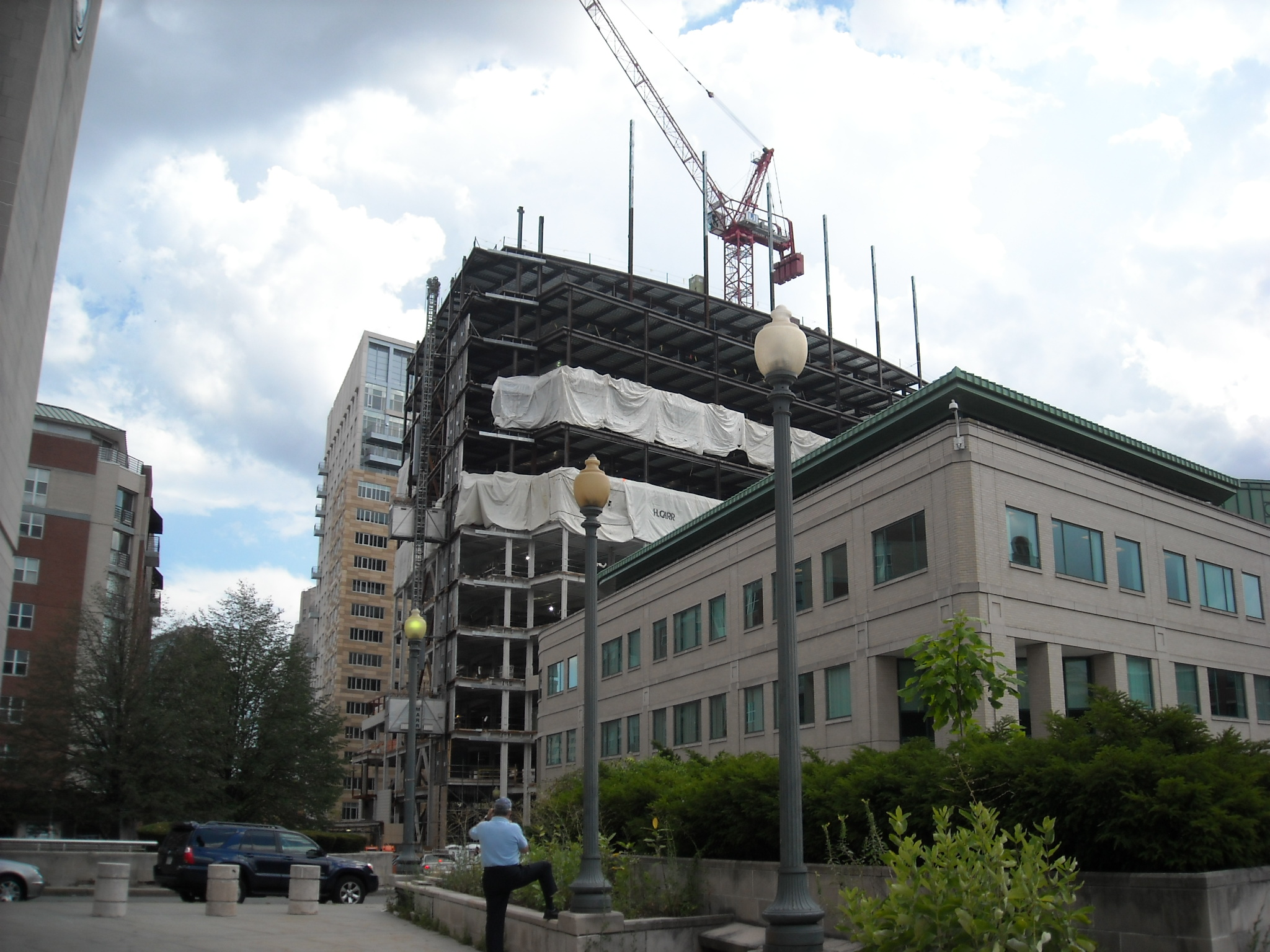
Construction as of 8 August 2008

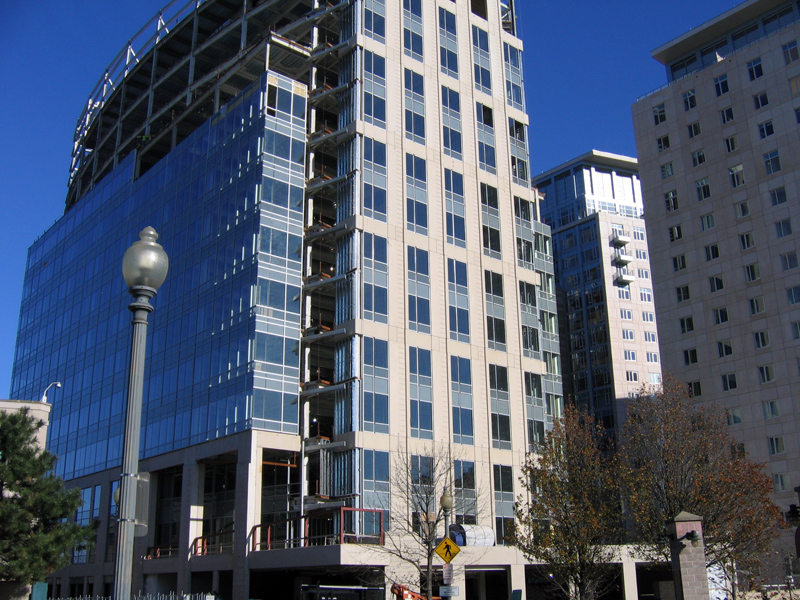
