= William Tremblay (writer) =

American poet, novelist, and professor

William Tremblay (born June 9, 1940) is an American poet, novelist, and Colorado State University Professor Emeritus.

Born in Southbridge, Massachusetts, Tremblay received a Bachelor of Arts in English Literature and a Master of Arts in American Literature from Clark University, and he received a Master of Fine Arts in Creative Writing (Poetry) from the University of Massachusetts Amherst' MFA Program for Poets & Writers. His awards include NEA, NEH, Fulbright, Pushcart Prize, Yaddo, and the John F. Stern Distinguished Professor Award from Colorado State University.

== Books ==
- The June Rise, Utah State University Press, re-released from Fulcrum Publishing
- Crying in the Cheap Seats, Umass Press
- Duhamel: Ideas of Order in Little Canada, BOA Editions Ltd.
- Second Sun: New & Selected Poems (L'Epervier Press)
- The Anarchist Heart, New Rivers Press (1977)
- Home Front, Lynx House Press (1978)
- Rainstorm Over the Alphabet, Lynx House Press (2001)
- Shooting Script: Door of Fire, Eastern Washington University Press (2003)
- Walks Along the Ditch, Lynx House Press (2016)
- The Luminous Race Track, Lynx House Press (2023)
