= Trinity Catholic Academy =

Coordinates: 42.0811°N 72.0373°W

- Southbridge, Massachusetts; USA

Information
- Type: Private Catholic School
- Established: 1889
- Grades: Pre-K to 8
- Enrollment: 170
- Colors: Blue & White
- Mascot: Bobcat
- Affiliation: St. John Paul II Parish
- Website: www.trinitycatholicacademy.org

Trinity Catholic Academy is a private Roman Catholic school located on the grounds of St. Mary's Church in Southbridge, Massachusetts. It is located in the Roman Catholic Diocese of Worcester.The school has an approximate enrollment of 250 students and classes range from Pre-K to the 8th grade. The student body is predominantly Catholic, but the Academy does accept students of all faiths.

The school official Facebook page is:https://www.facebook.com/TCABobcats/

== History ==
- 1889 The first Catholic school in the Southbridge area was opened by the pastor of St. Mary's Parish. Fr. John Drennan invited the Sisters of Saint Joseph to come and teach in the former Saint Peter’s church, located on the grounds of St. Mary’s Parish.
- 1936 Fr. Mullins, pastor of the parish, completely renovated the school, providing such modern conveniences as electrical lights and clocks. The school contained an elementary school on the first floor and a high school on the second floor.
- 1959 A new brick building was built next to the school to accommodate the high school. The new high school was named Saint Mary’s High School.
- 1961 First classes were held in the new building.
- 1964 First graduates from the Saint Mary’s High School
- 1965 Notre Dame High School merges with Saint Mary’s High School. The school is renamed Marianhill Central Catholic High School.
- 1988 Marianhill Central Catholic High School and Saint Mary's Grammar School, along with the recently opened Saint Mary's- Marianhill Junior High School merged into a single institution to be run by the diocese. These three schools now a unit, were obviously named for the Trinity: Trinity Catholic Academy.
- 1991 The high school was closed.
- 1992 The grammar school moves into the high school building, vacating the original school building that had been occupied for 102 years.
- 1999 The original building which housed the school for 102 years was destroyed by fire.
- 2002 Trinity Catholic Academy was granted a ten-year accreditation by the New England Association of Schools and Colleges, Inc. (NEASC) on December 5.

== Athletic Program ==
- Basketball
- Cheerleading
- Soccer
- Running

== Activities ==
- Choir
- Drama
- Faith in Action Team (FIAT)
- National Junior Honor Society
- Student Council
- Yearbook
- Girl Power
- Boys XL
- Give
- Lego Club

== Tuition ==
Tuition for the 2023-2024 academic year is $4,900.
