= Hamilton Woolen Company Historic District =

Historic district in Massachusetts, United States

- U.S. National Register of Historic Places
- U.S. Historic district
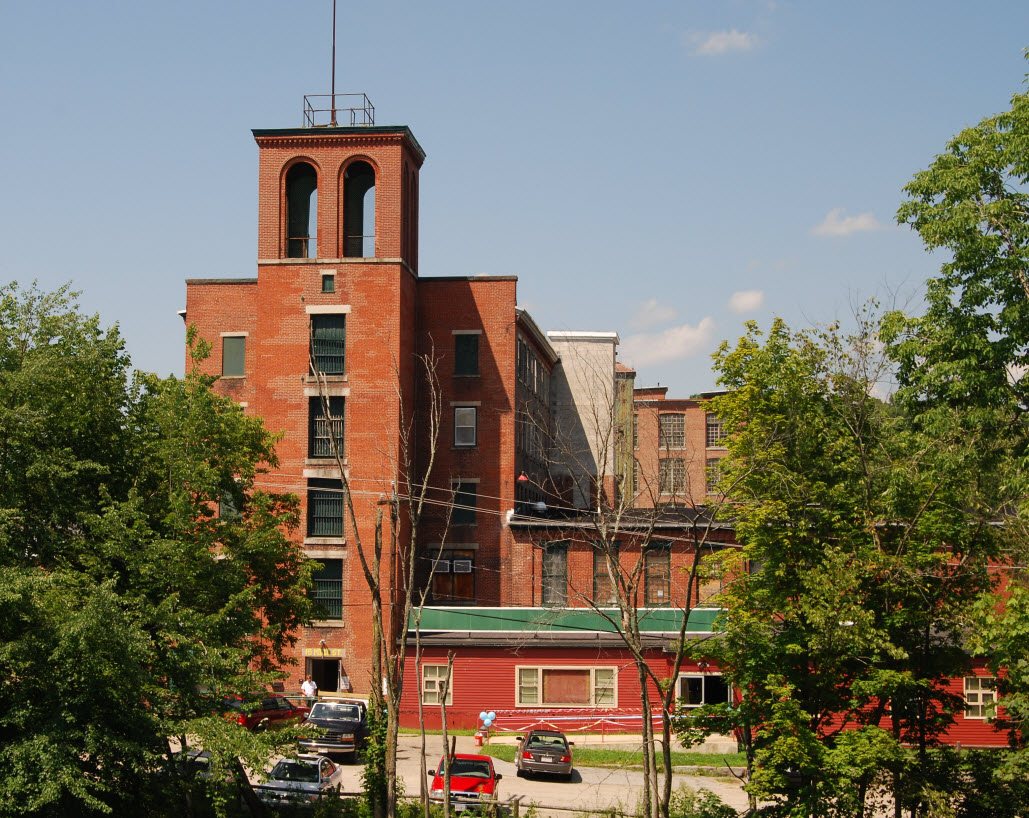

- Location within Massachusetts Location within the United States
- Location: Roughly bounded by McKinstry Brook, Quinebaug River, and Mill St., Southbridge, Massachusetts
- Coordinates: 42°4′56″N 72°2′37″W
- Built: 1836
- Architectural style: Greek Revival, Classical Industrial
- MPS: Southbridge MRA
- NRHP reference No.: 89000594
- Added to NRHP: June 22, 1989

The Hamilton Woolen Company Historic District encompasses the well preserved "Big Mill" complex of the Hamilton Woolen Company, built in the mid 19th century. Located at the confluence of McKinstry Brook and the Quinebaug River in central Southbridge, Massachusetts, the complex consists of a cluster of mill buildings and a rare collection of 1830s brick mill worker housing units located nearby. The district was listed on the National Register of Historic Places in 1989.

The site of the Hamilton Company's mill had been used as a mill site since 1750, when the first water privilege was granted to William Plimpton. In 1812 James and Perez Wolcott established a cotton mill on the site, building in 1814 what was at the time the world's largest cotton mill. The Wolcotts continued to expand their business, until a dam they built gave way, irreparably harming their business. Its remains were acquired by Boston investors, who formed the Hamilton Woolen Company in 1831. They rebuilt the dam to a higher level, and in 1836 embarked on a major expansion of the premises.

Among the buildings erected in 1836 are the Big Mill, a five-story brick structure that is the dominant feature of the complex. Extensively modified in 1850, the most distinctive feature of this building is an end stairwell which is capped by a tower with a Romanesque belfry. Immediately adjacent to the mill Brick Square was established. This was a cluster of brick housing units arranged around a quadrangle. This area, now bounded by Mill Street, Canal Street, and Brick Row, includes five surviving worker houses. Built in the then-popular Greek Revival style, one of them was later adapted for company offices.

The last remaining main mill building is the Dresser Street mill building.

== See also ==
- National Register of Historic Places listings in Southbridge, Massachusetts
- National Register of Historic Places listings in Worcester County, Massachusetts

== Archives and records ==
- Hamilton Woolen Company records at Baker Library Special Collections, Harvard Business School.
