= Southbridge, Massachusetts =

- City
- Town of Southbridge^{[*]}
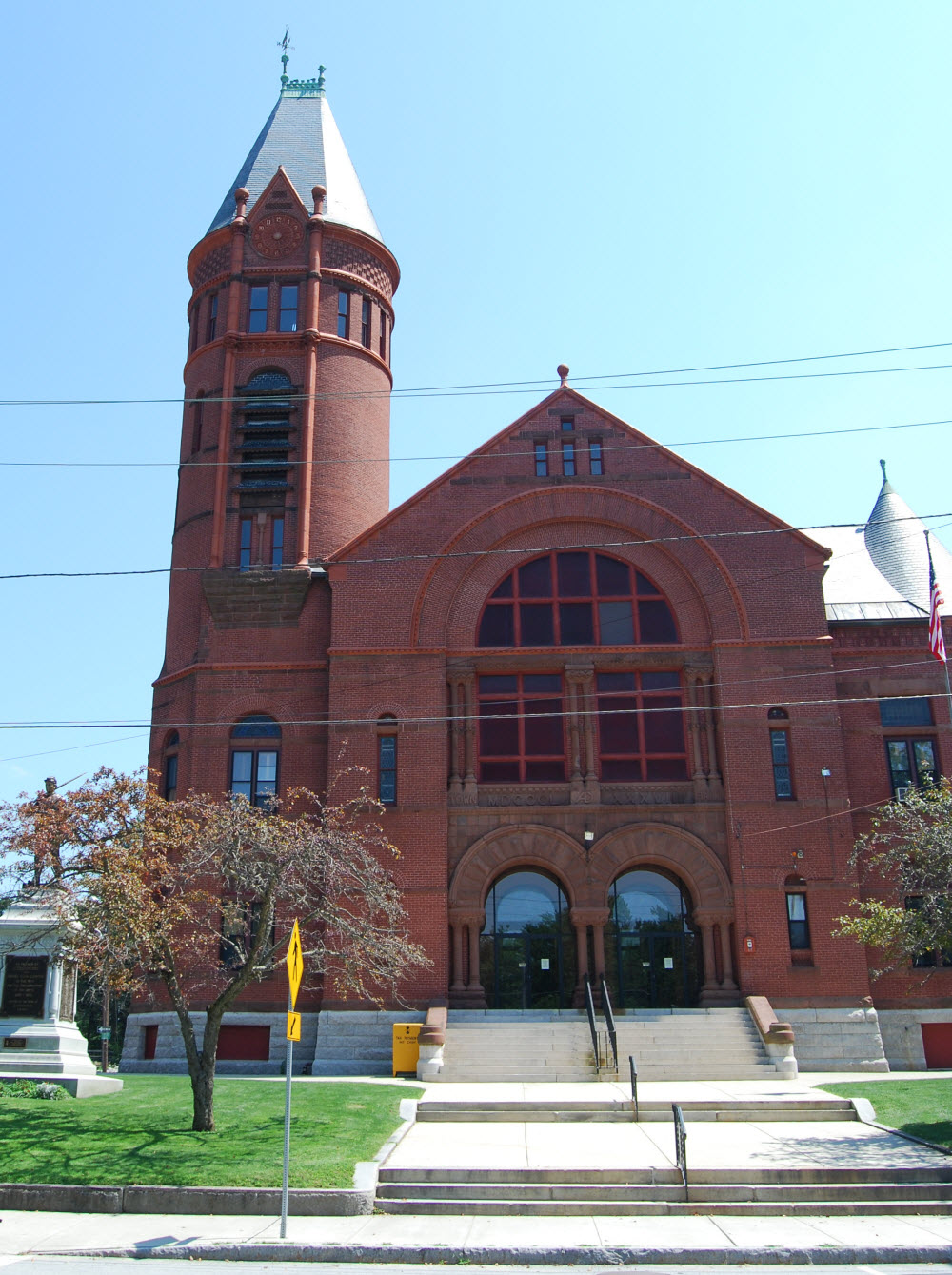
- Southbridge Town Hall

- Flag Seal
- Nickname: The Eye of the Commonwealth
- Location in Worcester County and the state of Massachusetts

- Location in the United States
- Coordinates: 42°04′30″N 72°02′02″W
- Country: United States
- State: Massachusetts
- County: Worcester
- Settled: 1730
- Incorporated: 1816

Government
  - Type: Council-manager
  - Town Manager: John Jovan
  - Town Council: Scott Lazo (Chairman); Michael Montigny (Vice-Chairman); George Chenier; John Daniel; Joseph Daou; Stephen Kelly; Michael Marketti; Ariel Ortiz; Jasmin Rivas

Area
  - Total: 20.86 sq mi (54.03 km^{2})
  - Land: 20.24 sq mi (52.42 km^{2})
  - Water: 0.62 sq mi (1.61 km^{2})
- Elevation: 489 ft (149 m)

Population (2020)
  - Total: 17,740
  - Density: 876.6/sq mi (338.44/km^{2})
- Time zone: UTC-5 (Eastern)
  - Summer (DST): UTC-4 (Eastern)
- ZIP code: 01550
- Area code: 508 / 774
- FIPS code: 25-63270
- GNIS feature ID: 0618383
- Website: ci.southbridge.ma.us

Southbridge is a city in Worcester County, Massachusetts, United States. The population was 17,740 at the 2020 census. Although Southbridge has a city form of government, it is legally known as the Town of Southbridge.

== History ==
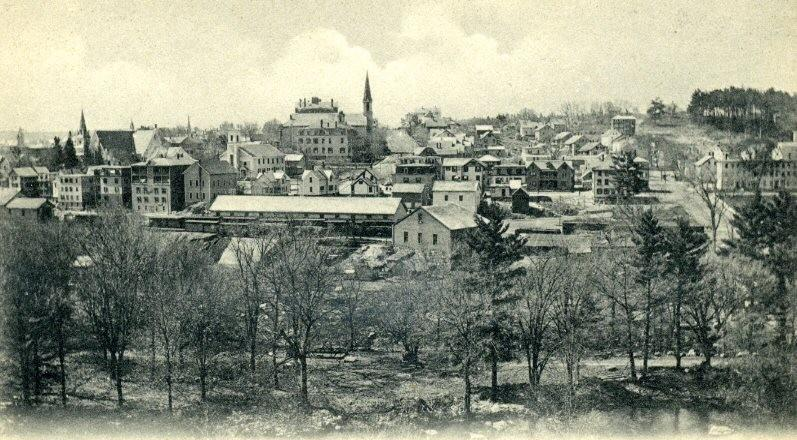
View of Southbridge c. 1905

The area was initially inhabited by the Nipmuck and Mohegan tribes, with the Quinebaug River dividing their territories. As early as 1638, John Winthrop Jr. purchased Tantiusques, a tract for mining "lead" centered at what is now Leadmine Road in Sturbridge (it was thought at the time that where there was lead, there should be silver nearby). In fact the mineral deposit was graphite which the Winthrops commercialized employing Nipmuck miners.

Southbridge was first settled by Europeans in 1730. In 1801 a poll parish, named the Second Religious Society of Charlton, and popularly called Honest Town, was formed from the west part of Dudley, the southwest part of Charlton and the southeast part of Sturbridge. In 1816 this parish was incorporated to become the township of Southbridge. Among the first settlers was Moses Marcy, who owned a home on the site of what is now Notre Dame church and was elected to Congress, and the Dennison family. Water power from the Quinebaug River made Southbridge a good location for sawmills and gristmills in the 18th century, and textile mills in the 19th century. After the Civil War, many immigrants of Irish and French Canadian descent came to work and live there; by the 1930s they had been joined by Poles, Greeks, Italians and others.

Southbridge has a long history of manufacturing optical products, earning it the unofficial title "Eye of the Commonwealth", in reference to the Commonwealth of Massachusetts. Under the Wells family, the American Optical Company ("AO") became the world's largest manufacturer of ophthalmic products, and at its height employed more than 6,000 people around the world. Many of its workers were exempted from the draft during World War II since they were doing vital defense work, including making Norden bombsights and even some work on the atomic bomb.

By the early 1960s, the mill town had a movie theatre, an AM radio station (WESO), and an airport. New immigrants from Puerto Rico, Laos, and Vietnam began arriving in the 1970s and 1980s, and the town now has a significant Hispanic and Puerto Rican population. The American Optical Company shut down in 1984, and Southbridge is still struggling from the loss of these and other manufacturing jobs.

== Geography ==
According to the United States Census Bureau, the city has a total area of 20.9 square miles (54 km^{2}), of which 20.4 square miles (53 km^{2}) is land and 0.5 square miles (1.3 km^{2}), or 2.40%, is water. Southbridge is drained by the Quinebaug River.

The principal road in Southbridge is Route 131, known as Main Street through downtown and East Main Street past the "AO Rotary" and through Sandersdale, a village on the town's east side. North-south roads include Eastford Road and Elm Street (Route 198), and Worcester Street-Mechanic Street-North Woodstock Road (Route 169). Also Gulpwood road leads up to Charlton and Dudley

Southbridge was formed out of portions of three of its neighboring towns: Sturbridge to the west, Charlton to the north, and Dudley to the east. The other neighboring town is Woodstock, Connecticut to the south.

== Demographics ==
Historical population
Year	Pop.	±%
1850	2,824	—
1860	3,575	+26.6%
1870	5,208	+45.7%
1880	6,464	+24.1%
1890	7,655	+18.4%
1900	10,025	+31.0%
1910	12,592	+25.6%
1920	14,245	+13.1%
1930	14,264	+0.1%
1940	16,825	+18.0%
1950	17,519	+4.1%
1960	16,523	−5.7%
1970	17,057	+3.2%
1980	16,665	−2.3%
1990	17,816	+6.9%
2000	17,214	−3.4%
2010	16,719	−2.9%
2020	17,740	+6.1%
2024*	18,106	+2.1%
* = population estimate. Source: United States census records and Population Estimates Program data. Source: U.S. Decennial Census

As of the census of 2010, there were 16,719 people, 7,077 households, and 4,522 families residing in the city. The population density was 858.9 inhabitants per square mile (331.6/km^{2}). There were 7,511 housing units at an average density of 368.9 per square mile (142.4/km^{2}). The racial makeup of the city was 81.2% White, 2.6% Black or African American, 0.5% Native American, 1.9% Asian, 0.0% Pacific Islander, and 2.9% from two or more races. Hispanic or Latino of any race were 26.6% of the population.

There were 7,077 households, out of which 31.1% had children under the age of 18 living with them, 43.6% were married couples living together, 15.5% had a female householder with no husband present, and 36.1% were non-families. 29.7% of all households were made up of individuals, and 12.1% had someone living alone who was 65 years of age or older. The average household size was 2.41 and the average family size was 2.98.

In the city, the population was spread out, with 25.4% under the age of 18, 8.6% from 18 to 24, 30.3% from 25 to 44, 20.7% from 45 to 64, and 15.1% who were 65 years of age or older. The median age was 36 years. For every 100 females, there were 92.8 males. For every 100 females age 18 and over, there were 87.2 males.

The median income for a household in the city was $33,913, and the median income for a family was $41,863. Males had a median income of $36,008 versus $25,685 for females. The per capita income for the city was $18,514. About 13.0% of families and 15.4% of the population were below the poverty line, including 25.8% of those under age 18 and 10.2% of those age 65 or over.

== Government ==
Southbridge is one of thirteen Massachusetts municipalities that have applied for, and been granted, city forms of government but wish to retain "The town of" in their official names

State government
State Representative(s):	Peter Durant (R)
State Senator(s):	Ryan Fattman (R)
Governor's Councilor(s):	Jen Caissie (R)
Federal government
U.S. Representative(s):	Richard E. Neal (D-1st District),
U.S. Senators:	Elizabeth Warren (D), Ed Markey (D)

Voter Registration and Party Enrollment as of February 1, 2025
Party	Number of Voters	Percentage
Democratic	2,873	19.49%
Republican	1,262	8.56%
Unaffiliated	6,096	71.0%
Other	139	0.94%
Total	14,738	100%

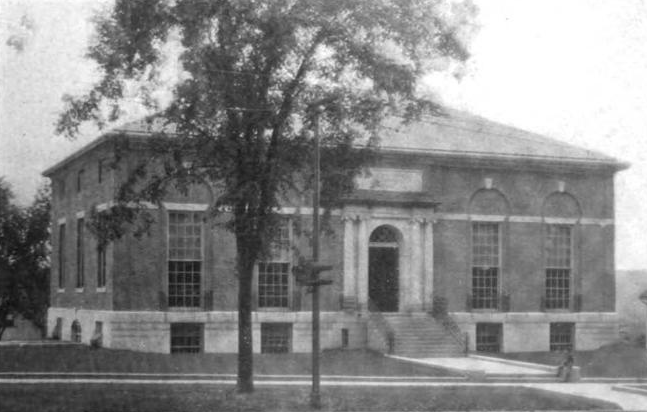
Southbridge public library, 1915

== Library ==
The Southbridge Public Library was founded in 1870. In fiscal year 2008, the town of Southbridge spent 1.03% ($426,025) of its budget on its public library—approximately $25 per person, per year ($32.94 adjusted for inflation to 2022).

The Jacob Edwards Library is the public library for the town of Southbridge. It is a member of Central Massachusetts Regional Library System (CMRLS) and C/W MARS.

== Education ==
Southbridge has two public elementary schools, formerly "neighborhood schools" serving grades K–5. Since the 1988–1989 school year, however, all kindergarten and 1st grade classes have been at Eastford Road School; all of grades 2–3 at Charlton Street School; and all of grades 4–5 at West Street School. In the mid 2010s Schools were shifted so that Eastford Road School housed Pre-K–1, and the Charlton Street School housed grades 2–5 in traditional neighborhood style, while the West Street School has been turned into a Dual Language School. Grades 6–12 are at Southbridge Middle School and Southbridge High School. Southbridge residents can also attend Bay Path Regional Vocational Technical High School in Charlton.

In addition to the public schools, a parochial private school, Trinity Catholic Academy, serves Pre-K through eighth grade.

On January 26, 2016, the Massachusetts Board of Elementary and Secondary Education placed Southbridge School District in state receivership.

== Transportation ==
Southbridge is served by Southbridge Municipal Airport(3B0), a public owned airport. Runway 02/20 has a 3501 x 75 feet asphalt surface.

== Sites of interest ==
- The Quinebaug Valley Council for the Arts and Humanities – Arts Center
- Gateway Players Theatre
- New York, New Haven & Hartford Passenger Depot
- Westville Lake and Recreation Area, outdoor recreation area along the Quinebaug River
- The Optical Heritage Museum

== Notable people ==
- Geraldo Alicea, politician
- George Thorndike Angell, lawyer
- Jeff Belanger, author
- Don Berry, statistician
- Franklin E. Brooks, politician
- Mark Carron, politician
- Sidney Clarke, politician
- George Constantine, racing driver
- Jane Cunningham Croly, author
- Joel DiGregorio, keyboardist for the Charlie Daniels Band
- Kenny Dykstra, wrestler
- Michael Earls, Jesuit priest
- John Fitzgerald, football player
- Félix Gatineau, historian and politician
- Francis Harper, biologist
- William L. Marcy, politician and Governor of New York
- Leo Martello, priest
- Ann McNamee, musician
- Tim Moriarty, journalist
- Calvin Paige, businessman and politician
- Winthrop D. Putnam, soldier
- Barbara Stevens, college basketball coach
- Charles Burt Sumner, minister
- Bill Swiacki, football player
- Marilyn Travinski, politician
- William Tremblay, poet, novelist, and professor
- Mfoniso Udofia, writer
- Cady Wells, painter
- David Wu, actor

== See also ==
- Center of Hope Foundation
- National Register of Historic Places listings in Southbridge, Massachusetts
- Hamilton Woolen Company Historic District
- Stonebridge Press, newspaper company based in Southbridge
- Westville Dam
- List of mill towns in Massachusetts
