= Clarke House =

Clarke House may refer to:

- Clarke–Harrell–Burson House, Van Buren, Arkansas, listed on the National Register of Historic Places (NRHP) in Crawford County
- Clarke Estate, Santa Fe Springs, California, NRHP-listed in Los Angeles County
- William Clarke Estate, Orange Park, Florida, NRHP-listed
- Clarkesville Garage, Clarkesville, Georgia, NRHP-listed in Habersham County
- Henry B. Clarke House, Chicago, Illinois, NRHP-listed
- James F. Clarke House, Fairfield, Iowa, NRHP-listed in Jefferson County
- Littleton T. Clarke House, Pocomoke City, Maryland, NRHP-listed
- Adams–Clarke House, Georgetown, Massachusetts, NRHP-listed
- Hancock–Clarke House, Lexington, Massachusetts, NRHP-listed
- Pitt Clarke House, Norton, Massachusetts, NRHP-listed
- Chaplin–Clarke House, Rowley, Massachusetts, NRHP-listed
- Clarke–Glover Farmhouse, Southbridge, Massachusetts, NRHP-listed
- Nehemiah P. Clarke House, St. Cloud, Minnesota, NRHP-listed in Stearns County
- Judge Enos Clarke House, Kirkwood, Missouri, NRHP-listed in St. Louis County
- Benjamin Clarke House, NRHP-listed
- Thomas Clarke House (Princeton, New Jersey), NRHP-listed
- Luther Clarke House, Dryden, New York, NRHP-listed
- Edwin W. and Charlotte Clarke House, Oswego, New York, NRHP-listed
- Clarke–Hobbs–Davidson House, Hendersonville, North Carolina, NRHP-listed in Henderson County
- William J. and Lodema Clarke House, Pendleton, Oregon, NRHP-listed in Umatilla County
- Clarke–Mossman House, Portland, Oregon, NRHP-listed
- Clarke Street Meeting House, Newport, Rhode Island, NRHP-listed
- Clark–Palmore House, Richmond, Virginia, NRHP-listed in Virginia
- George Lawrence Clarke Jr. House, Butler, Wisconsin, NRHP-listed in Waukesha County
- Bascom B. Clarke House, Madison, Wisconsin, NRHP-listed in Dane County

== See also ==
- Clarke Farm Site, Point Pleasant, Ohio, listed on the NRHP in Ohio
- Clark House (disambiguation)
