= Esther Vilar =

Argentine-German writer (born 1935)

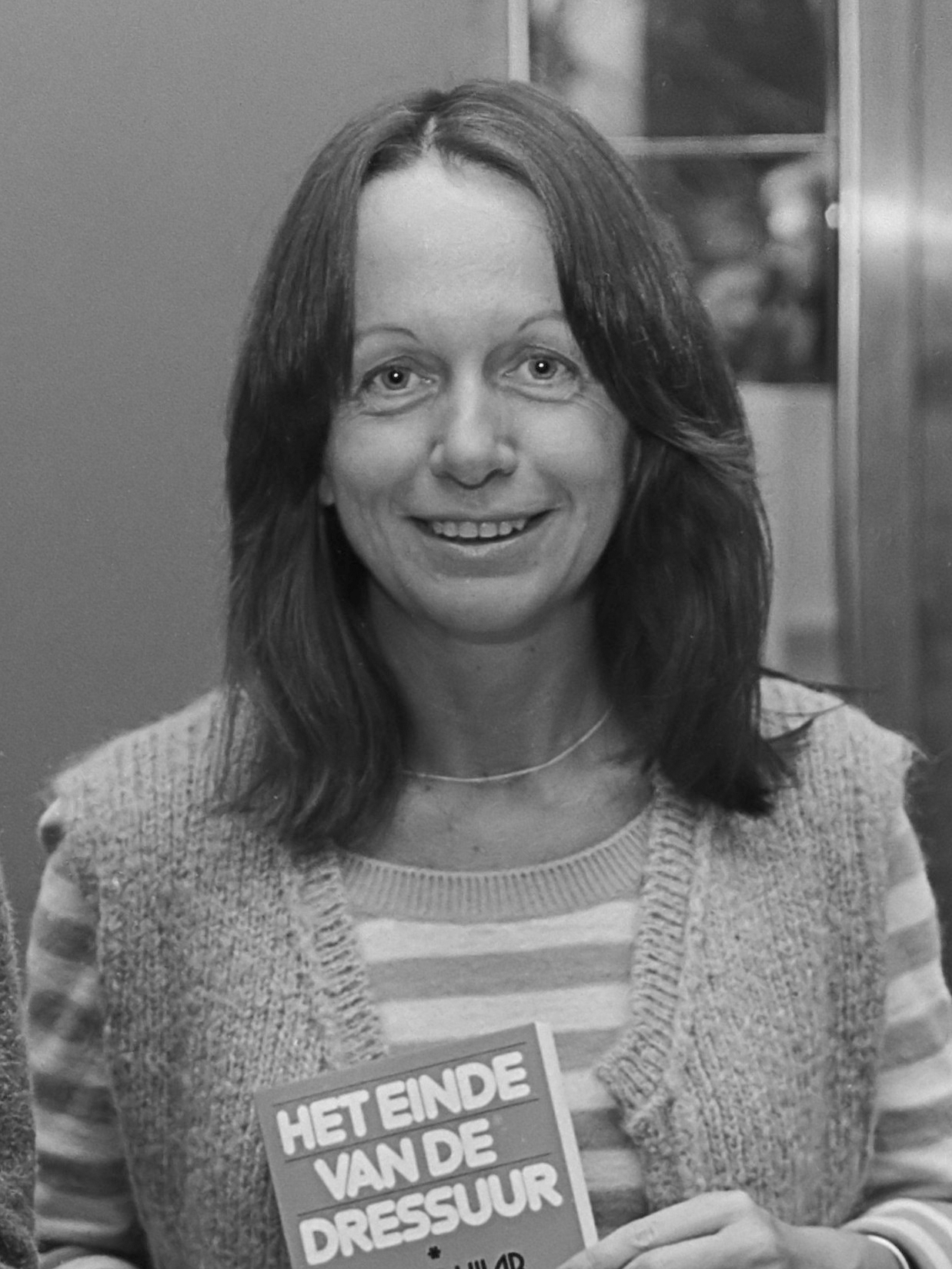
- Vilar in 1977
- Born: Esther Margareta Katzen; September 16, 1935 (age 91); Buenos Aires, Argentina
- Education: University of Buenos Aires
- Occupations: Writer, psychologist, physician, sociologist
- Spouse: Klaus Wagn (m. 1961; div. 1975)
- Writing career
- Notable work: The Manipulated Man (1971)

Esther Margareta Vilar (born Esther Margareta Katzen, September 16, 1935) is an Argentine-German writer. She trained and practised as a medical doctor before establishing herself as an author. She is best known for her 1971 book The Manipulated Man and its various follow-ups, which argue that, contrary to common feminist and women's rights rhetoric, women in industrialized cultures are not oppressed, but rather exploit a well-established system of manipulating men.

== Biography ==
Esther Vilar was born in Buenos Aires in 1935. Her parents had emigrated to Argentina after the Nazis came to power in the early 1930s because her father’s family was Jewish. Her mother, who was from Nuremberg, did not feel at home in exile and returned to Germany shortly after her daughter’s birth. There, she and Esther lived in Nuremberg. After the destruction of Nuremberg in World War II, she returned with her to Argentina to be with her husband for a few years.

Vilar studied medicine at the University of Buenos Aires, and in 1960 went to West Germany on scholarship to continue her studies in psychology and sociology. She worked as a doctor in a Bavarian hospital for a year, and has also worked as a translator, saleswoman, assembly-line worker in a thermometer factory, shoe model, and secretary.

Esther married the German author Klaus Wagn in 1961. The marriage ended in divorce but they had a son, Martin, in 1964. Concerning the divorce she stated, "I didn't break up with the man, just with marriage as an institution."

== Work ==
=== The Manipulated Man (1971) ===
One of Vilar's most popular books is titled The Manipulated Man, which she called part of a study on "man's delight in nonfreedom". In it, she claims that women are not oppressed by men, but rather control men in a relationship that is to their advantage but which most men are not aware of.

Some of the strategies described in her book are:

- Luring men with sex, which she referred to as the "periodic use of a woman's vagina", and other seduction strategies
- Controlling men by the judicious use of praise, sex, and emotional blackmail once they have been lured
- Masking her real intentions and motives in the guise of romantic love

The Manipulated Man was quite popular at the time of its release, in part due to the considerable press coverage it received.

Vilar appeared on The Tonight Show on February 21, 1973, to discuss the book. In 1975 she was invited to a televised debate by WDR with Alice Schwarzer, who became known as the representative of the women's movement at that time. The debate was controversial, with Schwarzer claiming Vilar was: "Not only sexist, but fascist", comparing her book with the Nazi newspaper Der Stürmer.

According to the author, she received death threats over the book:

So I hadn't imagined broadly enough the isolation I would find myself in after writing this book. Nor had I envisaged the consequences which it would have for subsequent writing and even for my private life – violent threats have not ceased to this date.

=== Other books ===
Her play Speer (1998) is a work of fictional biography about Albert Speer, a German architect and prominent Nazi, and has been staged in Berlin and London, directed by and starring Klaus Maria Brandauer. She has also written many other books and plays, but most have not been translated into English.

== Selected works ==
- The Manipulated Man. Pinter & Martin. 1998. ISBN 0-9530964-2-4.
- Der dressierte Mann [The Manipulated Man] (in German). Tritonpers. 1971. ISBN 90-6057-032-4.
- Book collecting original series of 3: Der dressierte Mann [The Manipulated Man], Das polygame Geschlecht [The polygamous sex], Das Ende der Dressur (The End of the Manipulation; third part never translated into English). dtv Verlag 1998. ISBN 978-3-423-36134-7
- The Polygamous Sex: A man's right to the other woman. W. H. Allen. 1976. ISBN 0-491-01737-5.
- Alt (in German). Herbig Verlagsbuchhandlung. 1980. ISBN 3-7766-1089-1.
- Oud (in Dutch). De Centaur. 1980. ISBN 90-6057-168-1.
- El discurso inaugural de la papisa americana [The inaugural address of the American papess] (in Spanish). Lectorum. 1982. ISBN 84-02-09008-7.
- Speer (in German). Transit. 1998. ISBN 9781861971555.

== See also ==
- Antifeminism
- Hypergamy
- Men's movement
- Men Going Their Own Way
