= Glover Street Historic District =

Historic district in Massachusetts, United States

- U.S. National Register of Historic Places
- U.S. Historic district
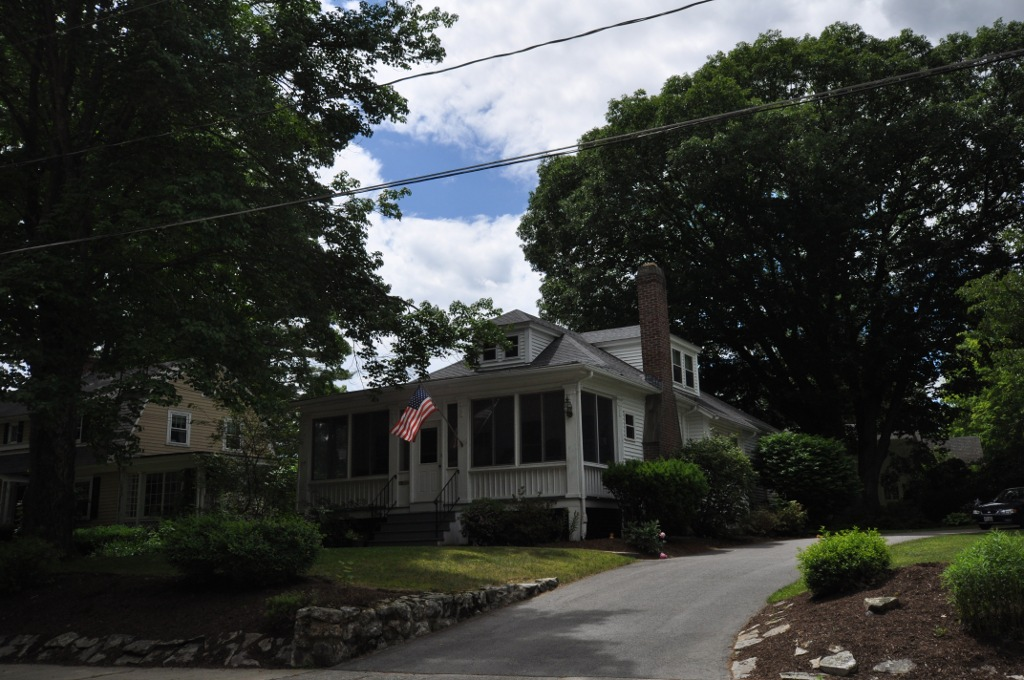
- 100 Glover Street

- Location within Massachusetts Location within the United States
- Location: Glover St. between High and Poplar Sts., Southbridge, Massachusetts
- Coordinates: 42°4′28″N 72°2′49″W
- Area: 5 acres (2.0 ha)
- Architectural style: Colonial Revival, Bungalow/craftsman, Queen Anne
- MPS: Southbridge MRA
- NRHP reference No.: 89000601
- Added to NRHP: June 22, 1989

The Glover Street Historic District is a residential historic district in Southbridge, Massachusetts. The district encompasses a cluster of nineteen houses on or adjacent to Glover Street between High and Poplar Streets. The area was fully developed beginning in the first decades of the 20th century, filling in a previous round of development that had taken place in the 1890s. These houses were targeted at Southbridge's growing middle class.

The land on which Glover Street was laid out was originally part of the Clarke-Glover Farm. In the 1880s a series of Gothic style 1 1/2-story cottages were built at the northern end of Glover Street. Six of these in particular feature jigsaw-cut bargeboard trim decoration and are among the best preserved of their type in Southbridge. This period of development also saw construction of a house and barn with Italianate Victorian styling.

The second construction phase ran from the 1910s to the 1930s, and once again saw the construction of modestly sized houses in the styles of the period. Most of these structures are Colonial Revival in styling, although there is one house with some Bungalow/craftsman styling. The district includes one house that predates the development of Glover Street: a vernacular frame house dating to the early 19th century that faces High Street at its corner with Glover. That house may have been associated with the Clarkes whose land it was.

The district was listed on the National Register of Historic Places in 1989.

== See also ==
- National Register of Historic Places listings in Southbridge, Massachusetts
- National Register of Historic Places listings in Worcester County, Massachusetts
