= Antifeminism =

Ideology opposing feminism

Antifeminism or anti-feminism is opposition to feminism. In the late 19th century and early 20th century, antifeminists opposed particular policy proposals for women's rights, such as the right to vote, educational opportunities, property rights, and access to birth control. In the mid and late 20th century, antifeminists often opposed the abortion-rights movement.

In the early 21st century, some antifeminists see their ideology as a response to perceived misandry, holding feminism responsible for several social problems, including lower college entrance and graduate rates of young men, gender differences in suicide and a perceived decline in masculinity. 21st century antifeminism has sometimes been an element of violent, far-right extremist acts. Antifeminism is often linked to the men's rights movement, a social movement concerned with perceived discrimination against men.

== Definition ==
Canadian sociologists Melissa Blais and Francis Dupuis-Déri write that antifeminist thought has primarily taken the form of masculinism, in which "men are in crisis because of the feminization of society".

The term antifeminist is also used to describe public female figures, some of whom, such as Naomi Wolf, Camille Paglia, and Katie Roiphe, define themselves as feminists, based on their opposition to some or all elements of feminist movements. Other feminists label writers such as Roiphe, Christina Hoff Sommers, Jean Bethke Elshtain, and Elizabeth Fox-Genovese as antifeminist because of their positions regarding oppression and lines of thought within feminism.

The meaning of antifeminism has varied across time and cultures, and antifeminism attracts both men and women. Some women, like those in the Women's National Anti-Suffrage League, campaigned against women's suffrage.

Men's studies scholar Michael Kimmel defines antifeminism as "the opposition to women's equality". He says that antifeminists oppose "women's entry into the public sphere, the re-organization of the private sphere, women's control of their bodies, and women's rights generally." Kimmel further writes that antifeminist argumentation relies on "religious and cultural norms" while proponents of antifeminism advance their cause as a means of "'saving' masculinity from pollution and invasion". He argues that antifeminists consider the "traditional gender division of labor as natural and inevitable, perhaps also divinely sanctioned."

== Ideology ==
Antifeminist ideology rejects at least one of the following general principles of feminism:

1. That social arrangements among men and women are neither natural nor divinely determined.
2. That social arrangements among men and women favor men.
3. That there are collective actions that can and should be taken to transform these arrangements into more just and equitable arrangements.

Some antifeminists argue that feminism, despite claiming to advocate for equality, ignores rights issues unique to men. They believe that the feminist movement has achieved its aims and now seeks higher status for women than for men via special rights and exemptions, such as female-only scholarships, affirmative action, and gender quotas.

Antifeminism might be motivated by the belief that feminist theories of patriarchy and disadvantages suffered by women in society are incorrect or exaggerated; that feminism as a movement encourages misandry and results in harm or oppression of men; or driven by general opposition towards women's rights.

Furthermore, antifeminists view feminism as a denial of innate psychological sex differences and an attempt to reprogram people against their biological tendencies. They have argued that feminism has resulted in changes to society's previous norms relating to sexuality, which they see as detrimental to traditional values or conservative religious beliefs. For example, the ubiquity of casual sex and the decline of marriage are mentioned as negative consequences of feminism. In a report from anti-extremism charity HOPE not Hate, half of young men from UK believe that feminism has "gone too far and makes it harder for men to succeed".

Moreover, other antifeminists oppose women's entry into the workforce, political office, or the voting process, as well as the lessening of male authority in families. They argue that a change of women's roles is a destructive force that endangers the family, or is contrary to religious morals. For example, Paul Gottfried maintains that the change of women's roles "has been a social disaster that continues to take its toll on the family" and contributed to a "descent by increasingly disconnected individuals into social chaos".

== History ==
=== United States ===
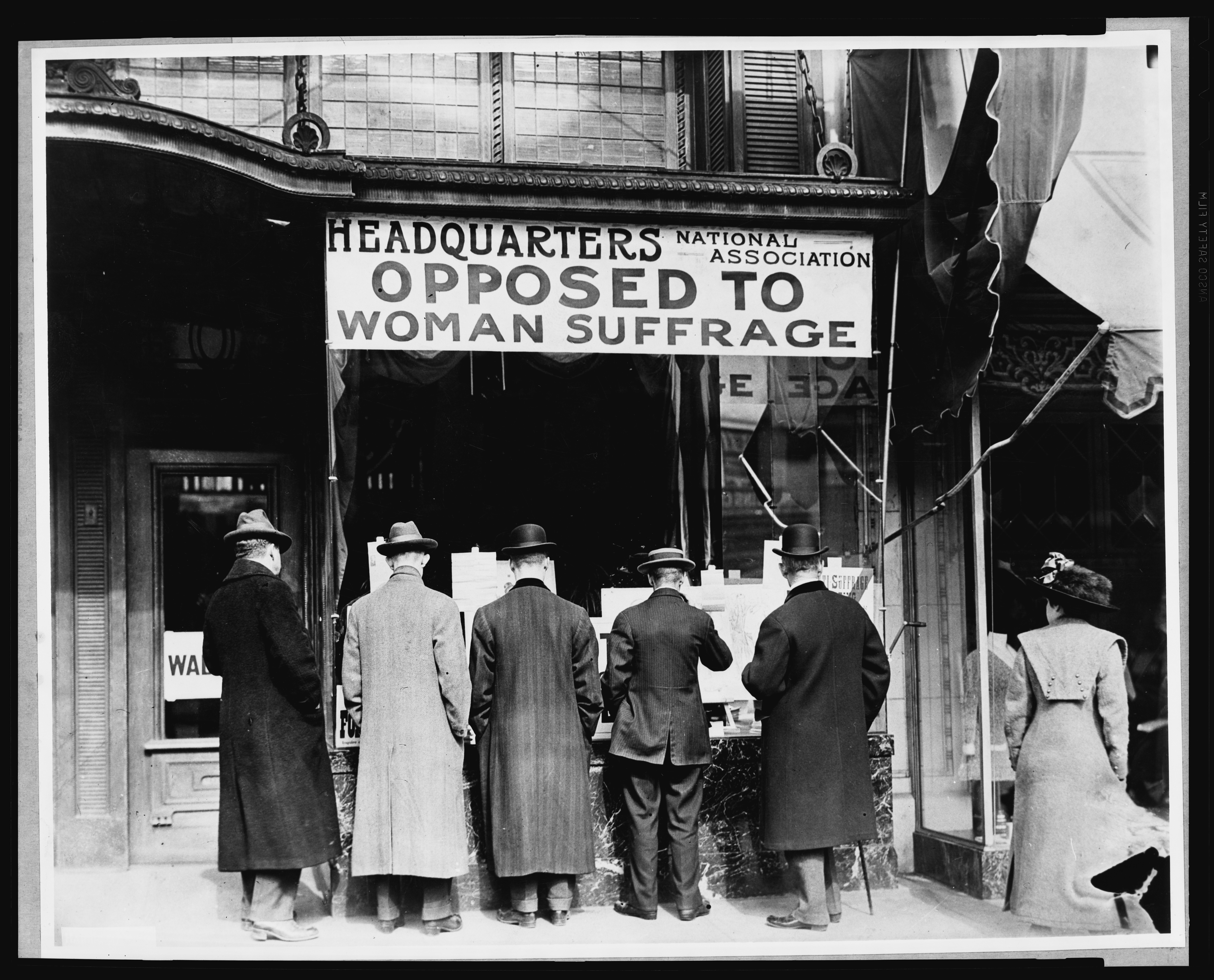
American antisuffragists in the early 20th century

==== 19th century ====
The "women's movement" began in 1848, most famously articulated by Elizabeth Cady Stanton demanding voting rights, joined by Lucy Stone, Susan B. Anthony and others who also pushed for other rights such as education, job freedom, marital and property rights, and the right to choose when or whether to become a mother. By the end of the century, a cultural counter movement had begun. Janet Chafetz identified in a study 32 first-wave antifeminist movements, including those in the 19th century and early 20th century movements.

These countermovements were in response to some women's growing demands, which were perceived as threatening to the standard way of life. Though men were not the only antifeminists, men experienced what some have called a "crisis of masculinity" in response to traditional gender roles being challenged. Men's responses to increased feminism varied. Some men subscribed to feminist ideals, and others became decidedly antifeminist. Antifeminist men cited religious models and natural law to emphasize women's need to return to the private sphere, in order to preserve the current social order.

In the 19th century, one of the major focal points of antifeminism was opposition to women's suffrage, which began as a grassroots movement in 1848 and spanned for 72 years. Opponents of women's entry into institutions of higher learning argued that education was too great a physical burden on women. In Sex in Education: or, a Fair Chance for the Girls (1873), Harvard professor Edward Clarke predicted that if women went to college, their brains would grow bigger and heavier, and their wombs would atrophy. Other antifeminists opposed women's entry into the labor force, their right to join unions, to sit on juries, or to obtain birth control and control of their sexuality.

The pro-family movement appeared in the late 19th century, by about 1870. This movement was intended to halt the rising divorce rate and reinforce traditional family values. The National League for the Protection of the Family, formerly known as the Divorce Reform League, took over the movement in 1881. Samuel Dike was one of the founders of the League, and was considered an early expert on divorce. Through his efforts, the League garnered attention from pro-family advocates. It underwent a shift from fighting against divorce to promoting marriage and traditional family. Speaking on behalf of the League in an 1887 address to the Evangelical Alliance Conference, Samuel Dike described the ideal family as having "one man and one woman, united in wedlock, together with their children". This movement built the foundation for many pro-family arguments in contemporary antifeminism.

==== Early 20th century ====
Women's suffrage was achieved in the US in 1920, and early 20th-century antifeminism was primarily focused on fighting this. Suffragists scoffed at antisuffragists. Anna Howard Shaw, president of the National American Woman Suffrage Association (NAWSA) from 1904 to 1915, presumed that the antisuffragists were merely working under the influence of male forces. Later historians tended to dismiss antisuffragists as subscribing to the model of domestic idealism, that a woman's place is in the home. This undermines and belittles the true power and numbers behind the antisuffrage movement, which was primarily led by women themselves.

Arguments employed by antisuffragists at the turn of the century had less to do with a woman's place in the home as much as it had to do with a woman's proper place in the public realm. Leaders of the movement often encouraged other women to leave the home and participate in society. What they opposed was women participating in the political sphere.

There were two reasons antisuffragists opposed women participating in the political realm. Some argued that women were already overburdened. The majority of them, however, argued that a woman's participation in the political realm would hinder her participation in social and civic duties. If they won the right to vote, women would have to align with a particular party, which would destroy their ability to be politically neutral. Antisuffragists feared this would hinder their influence with legislative authorities.

==== Mid 20th century ====
In 1951, two journalists published Washington Confidential. The novel claimed that Communist leaders used their men and women to recruit a variety of minorities in the nation's capital, such as females, colored males, and homosexual males. The popularity of the book led the Civil Service Commission to create a "publicity campaign to improve the image of federal employees" in hopes to save their federal employees from losing their jobs. This ploy failed once the journalists linked feminism to communism in their novel, and ultimately reinforced antifeminism by implying that defending the "white, Christian, heterosexual, patriarchal family" was the only way to oppose communism.

==== Late 20th century ====
===== Equal Rights Amendment =====
The Equal Rights Amendment (ERA) is a perennially proposed amendment to the United States Constitution that would grant equal rights and opportunities to every citizen of the United States, regardless of their sex. In 1950 and 1953, ERA was passed by the Senate with a provision known as "the Hayden rider", making it unacceptable to ERA supporters. The Hayden rider was included to keep special protections for women. A new section to the ERA was added, stating: "The provisions of this article shall not be construed to impair any rights, benefits, or exemptions now or hereafter conferred by law upon persons of the female sex." That is, women could keep their existing and future special protections that men did not have.

By 1972, the amendment was supported by both major parties and was immensely popular. However, it was defeated in Congress when it failed to get the vote of 38 legislatures by 1982. Supporters of an unaltered ERA rejected the Hayden rider, believing an ERA containing the rider did not provide for equality.

In 1986, Jerome Himmelstein identified two main theories about the appeal of antifeminism and its role in opposition to the ERA. One theory is that it was a clash between upper-class liberal voters and the older, more conservative lower-class rural voters, who often serve as the center for right-wing movements. This theory identifies particular social classes as more inherently friendly to antifeminism. Another theory holds that women who feel vulnerable and dependent upon men, are likely to oppose anything that threatens that tenuous stability. Under this view, while educated, independent career women may support feminism, housewives who lack such resources are more drawn to antifeminism. Himmelstein says both views are at least partially wrong, arguing that the primary dividing line between feminists and antifeminists is cultural, rather than stemming from differences in economic and social status.

There are similarities between income between activists on both sides of the ERA debate. The most indicative factors when predicting ERA position, especially among women, were race, marital status, age, and education. ERA opposition was much higher among white, married, older, and less educated citizens. Women who opposed the ERA tended to fit characteristics consistent with the Religious Right.

In 1983, Val Burris said that high-income men opposed the amendment, because they would gain the least with it being passed; that those men had the most to lose, since the ratification of the ERA would mean more competition for their jobs and possibly a lowered self-esteem. Because of the support of antifeminism from conservatives and the constant "conservative reactions to liberal social politics", such as the New Deal attacks, the attack on the ERA has been called a "right-wing backlash". In a 2012 study, their methods include actions such as "insults proffered in emails or on the telephone, systematic denigration of feminism in the media, Internet disclosure of confidential information (e.g. addresses) on resources for battered women" and more.

===== Abortion =====
Anti abortion rhetoric largely has religious underpinnings, influence, and is often promoted by activists of strong religious faith. The anti-abortion movement protests in the form of educational outreach, political mobilisation, street protests (largely at abortion clinics), and is often aimed at convincing pregnant women to carry their pregnancies to term.

Abortion remains one of the most controversial topics in the United States. Roe v. Wade was decided in 1973, and abortion was utilized by many antifeminists to rally supporters. Antiabortion views helped further several right-wing movements, including explicit antifeminism, and helped right-wing politicians rise to power.

==== 21st century ====
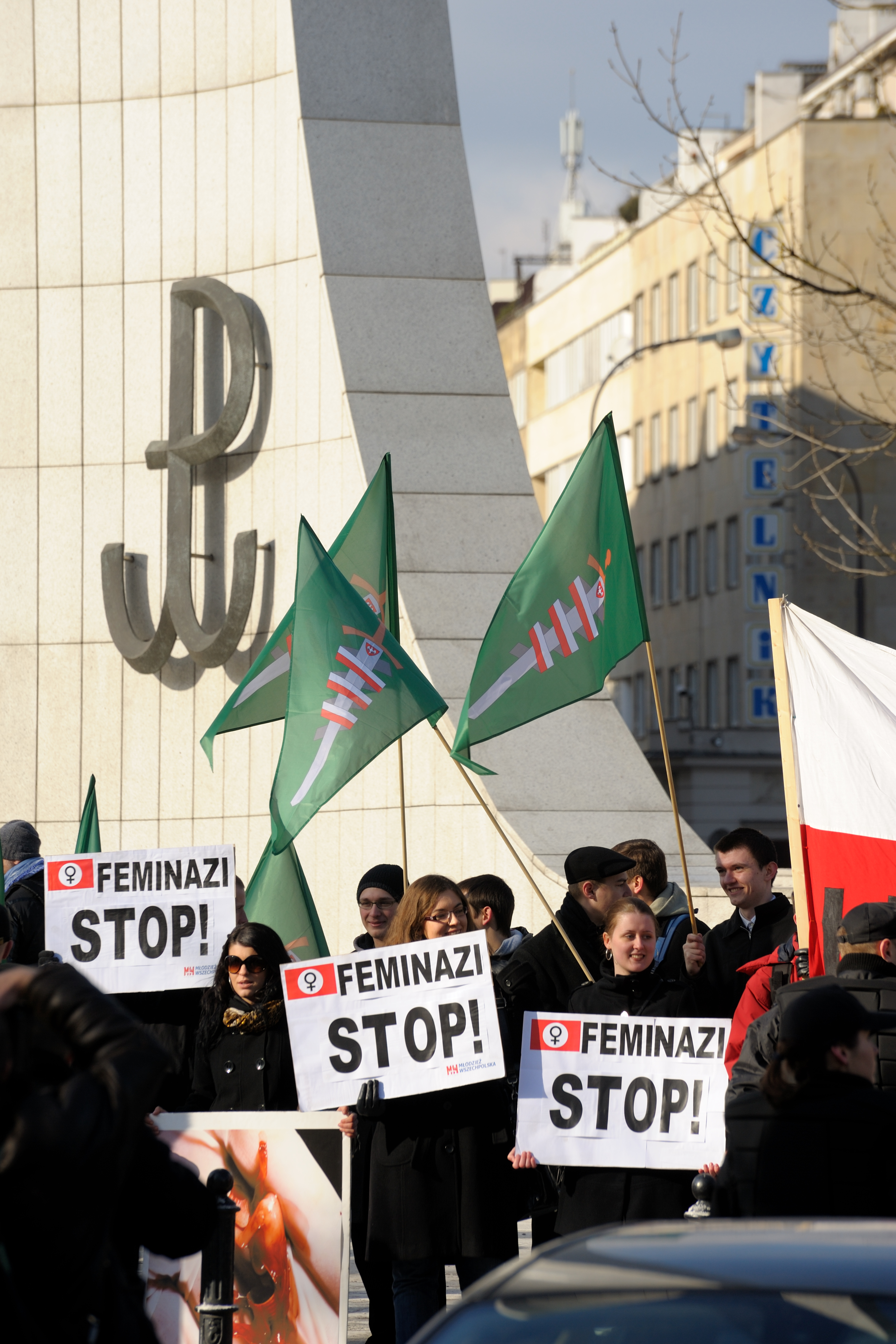
A group of Polish ultranationalists protest an International Women's Day march in Warsaw, 2010

Some current antifeminist practices can be traced back to the rise of the Christian right in the late 1970s. Antifeminist internet communities and hashtags include men's rights activists, incels ("involuntary celibates"), pickup artists, "meninism", "Red Pill", #YourSlipisShowing, #gamergate, and Men Going Their Own Way (MGTOW). These communities overlap with various white supremacist, authoritarian, and populist movements.

In 2014, users of the social media hashtag #WomenAgainstFeminism argued that feminism demonizes men and that women are not oppressed in 21st century Western countries. A meta-analysis in 2023 published in the journal Psychology of Women Quarterly investigated the stereotype of feminists' attitudes to men and concluded that feminist views of men were no different to that of non-feminists or men towards men and titled the phenomenon the misandry myth – "We term the focal stereotype the misandry myth in light of the evidence that it is false and widespread, and discuss its implications for the movement."

Many scholars consider the men's rights movement a backlash or countermovement to feminism. The men's rights movement generally incorporates points of view that reject feminist and profeminist ideas. Men's rights activists say feminism has radicalized its objective and harmed men. Men's rights activists believe that men are victims of feminism and "feminizing" influences in society, and that entities such as public institutions now discriminate against men.

The website Jezebel has also reported on an increasing number of women and female celebrities rejecting feminism and instead subscribing to humanism.

In response to the social media trend, modern day feminists also began to upload similar pictures to websites such as Twitter and Tumblr. Most used the same hashtag, "womenagainstfeminism", but instead made satirical and bluntly parodic comments. In November 2014, Time magazine included "feminist" on its annual list of proposed banished words. After initially receiving the majority of votes (51%), a Time editor apologized for including the word in the poll and removed it from the results.

=== Germany ===
In March 2019, the Verein Deutsche Sprache ("German Language Association"), an advocacy group for German language purism, organized a petition proclaiming that billions of Euros are being wasted in Germany on "gender gaga" (gender-neutral language and gender studies). This is money the organization believes can be better used to fund hospitals, natural science faculties and virus research institutes.

=== Serbia ===
In April 2022, far-right political party Leviathan, with a significant public profile of almost 300,000 Facebook followers, missed out on a seat in parliament in Serbia's 2022 election. The Leviathan party portrays migrants as criminals, and themselves as the defenders of Serbian women. The group has been praised by some in Serbia for defending 'traditional family values' and hierarchical gender roles, while opposing the empowerment of women and feminist ideologies.

=== South Korea ===
Disgruntled young men have become vocal critics of feminism and feminist women who speak out in public in the recent years. Yoon Suk-yeol narrowly won South Korea's 2022 presidential election. During his run for presidency, he called for the Ministry of Gender Equality and Family to be abolished, and accused its officials of treating men like "potential sex criminals." Yoon also said that he doesn't think systemic structural discrimination based on gender exists in South Korea. Due to the various methods of calculating and measuring gender inequality, South Korea's gender inequality rankings vary across different reports. In 2023, South Korea ranked 30th out of 177 countries on the Women, Peace and Security Index, which is based on 13 indicators of inclusion, justice, and security. In 2023, South Korea has ranked 20th out of 193 countries on the Human Development Index (HDI). In 2025, it ranked 12th out of 172 countries on Gender Inequality Index(GII), making the country the 2nd least gender unequal state in Asia. On the other hand, South Korea ranked low on Global Gender Gap Report, placing 99th out of 146 in 2022, leading to criticism of having deep gender inequalities.

Hwang argued that despite decades of anti-discriminatory gender policies and better education for women, there is persistent discrimination of gender in workplaces in South Korea. He explained that the reasons for this is due to the lack of legal and inefficient enforcement of the gender-based policies. He described the punishment for gender-based crimes to be weak, and argued that the culture of South Korea typically favors male dominance which influences the organizational structure of workplaces and boosts societal pressures for women. Hwang claimed that driven by public anger and media coverage, South Korea has seen a boost in actions against sex crimes since the mid-2000s. South Korean K-WomenLink has advocated for systems to support the survivors of sexual violence whilst highlighting the deficiencies in the system. Hwang also argued that Cases with high influence of victim-blaming, flawed procedures, moreover cases involving individuals (perpetrators) in high social positions were challenged by the organization.

There has been a hashtag, that was popular on Twitter in South Korea "#iamafeminist" which normalized the term "feminism", in a society where it was once unacceptable. This hashtag facilitated feminist activism and played a role against misogyny, where identification as a feminist is often stigmatized. The expression of feminist identity was utilized through this hashtag, and people started to discuss their personal experiences that were related to gender inequality. The hashtag was used for a variety of issues, where not only feminists and activists, but also ordinary individuals shared their hardships on housework, equal pay, sexual harassment, etc.

== Organizations ==
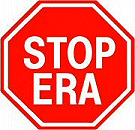
Symbol used for signs and buttons by ERA opponents

Founded in the U.S. by Phyllis Schlafly in 1972, Stop ERA, now known as "Eagle Forum", lobbied successfully to block the passage of the Equal Rights Amendment in the U.S. It was also Schlafly who forged links between Stop ERA and other conservative organizations, as well as single-issue groups against abortion, pornography, gun control, and unions. By integrating Stop ERA with the thus-dubbed "New Right", she was able to leverage a wider range of technological, organizational and political resources, successfully targeting pro-feminist candidates for defeat.

In India, the Save Indian Family Foundation is an antifeminist organization opposed to a number of laws that they claim to have been used against men.

The Concerned Women of America (CWA) are also an antifeminist organization. Like other conservative women's groups, they oppose abortion and same-sex marriage and make appeals for maternalism and biological differences between women and men.

The Independent Women's Forum (IWF) is another antifeminist, conservative, women-oriented group. It's younger and less established than the CWA, though the two organizations are often discussed in relation to each other. It was founded to take on the "old feminist establishment". Both of these organizations pride themselves on rallying women who do not identify with feminist rhetoric together. These organizations frame themselves as being by women, for women, in order to fight the idea that feminism is the only women-oriented ideology. These organizations chastise feminists for presuming to universally speak for all women. The IWF claims to be "the voice of reasonable women with important ideas who embrace common sense over divisive ideology".

Another antifeminist merger, which is not yet an acknowledged organization but became a large movement, is the "incel" movement, an internet-culture, which is increasingly widespread via online forums, especially in the US. After the term came up the first time by a woman in the 1990s to define feelings of social awkwardness, in began that the term was used in other contexts. Lately, the term incel is composed of the words "involuntarily" and "celibate" (sexual abstinence) and it is mostly young men in their mid-twenties, identifying with the incel movement, whose overall themes consist of failure and frustration what for they accuse woman and society's structure changes of experiencing a shortage of sexual activity and romantic success, how the Anti-Defamation League defined that movement.

The movement can be classified as misogynist, violent and extremist. Some incels are considered as a danger to the public as well as to individuals, especially women. Their ideology consists of antifeminist ideologies, according to which a hierarchy, based on appearance determines access to sexual relationships and recognition in society, as well as the belief in "hypergamy", that woman use unconsciously their sexuality for social advancement, which would make them sexually selective and ultimately leads to the third ideology of the rejection of feminism.

According to the German Federal Agency for Civic Education, their hierarchy is composed by three classes of men, the attractive men at the top, as "chads" or "alphas", followed by the so-called "normies", the normal men and finally the incels as the loser of the system. With their allegations, they claim to have a fundamental right to sex, which they are denied. In addition to the accusations towards women, their beliefs are anti-immigrant, as their hatred is also directed against migrants, who would take away their sexual partners.

== Explanatory theories ==
According to Amherst College sociology professor Jerome L. Himmelstein, antifeminism is rooted in social stigmas against feminism and is thus a purely reactionary movement. Himmelstein identifies two prevailing theories that seek to explain the origins of antifeminism: the first theory, proposed by Himmelstein, is that conservative opposition in the abortion and Equal Rights Amendment (ERA) debates has created a climate of hostility toward the entire feminist movement.

The second theory Himmelstein identifies states that the female antifeminists who lead the movement are largely married, low education, and low personal income women who embody the "insecure housewife scenario" and seek to perpetuate their own situation in which women depend on men for fiscal support. However, numerous studies have failed to correlate the aforementioned demographic factors with support for antifeminism, and only religiosity correlates positively with antifeminist alignment.

Authors Janet Saltzman Chafetz and Anthony Gary Dworkin, writing for Gender and Society, argue that the organizations most likely to formally organize against feminism are religious. This is because women's movements may demand access to male-dominated positions within the religious sector, like the clergy, and women's movements threaten male-oriented values of some religions. The more successful a feminist movement is in challenging the authority of male-dominated groups, the more these groups will organize a countermovement.

== Implicit feminism ==
University of Illinois at Chicago sociology professor Danielle Giffort argues that the stigma against feminism created by antifeminists has resulted in organizations that practice "implicit feminism", which she defines as the "strategy practiced by feminist activists within organizations that are operating in an anti- and post-feminist environment in which they conceal feminist identities and ideas while emphasizing the more socially acceptable angles of their efforts".

Due to the stigma against feminism, some activists, such as those involved with Girls Rock, may take the principles of feminism as a foundation of thought and teach girls and women independence and self-reliance without explicitly labeling it with the stigmatized brand of feminism. Thus, most women continue to practice feminism in terms of seeking equality and independence for women, yet avoid the label.

== Connections to far-right politics and extremism ==
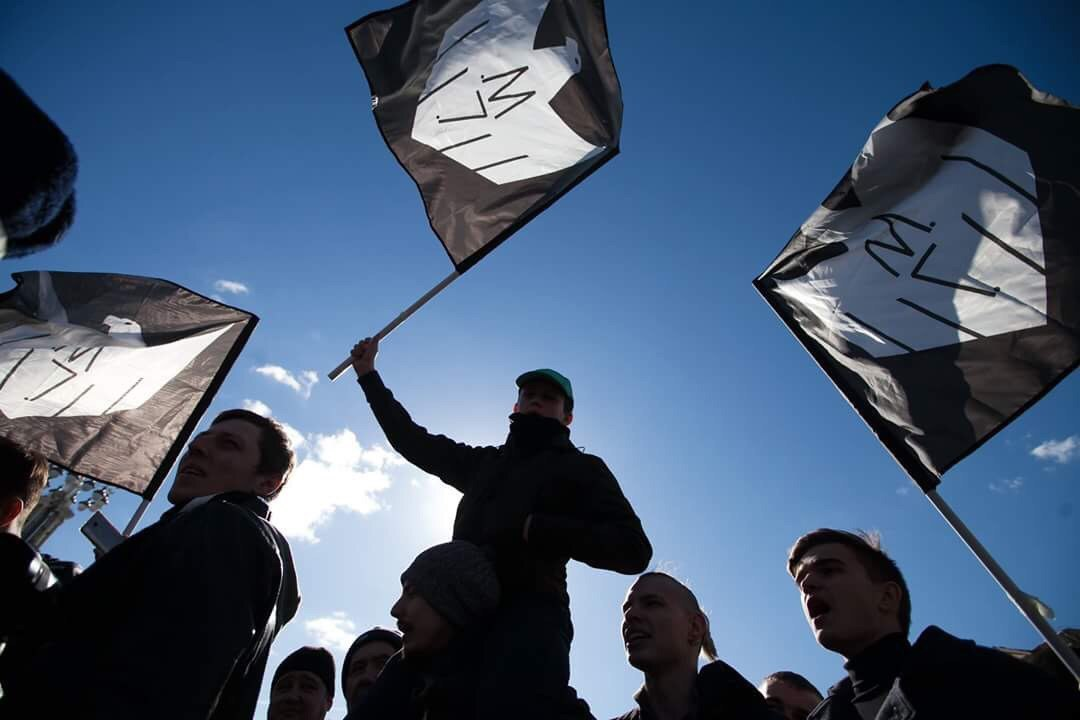
2017 protest by Male State, a Russian far-right, antifeminist group that explicitly advocates for a "national patriarchy."

Antifeminism and male supremacist beliefs are consistently identified as an underlying motivation for far-right politics. The rise of the European radical right since the 1980s, the Proud Boys in the United States, and the election of Yoon Suk Yeol in South Korea have been associated with antifeminist positions. Many who affiliate with the white nationalist alt-right movement are antifeminist, with antifeminism and resentment of women being a common recruitment gateway into the movement.

Antifeminism has also been linked to acts of far-right terrorism. For example, the perpetrators of the Christchurch massacre and the El Paso Walmart shooting appear to have been motivated by the conspiracy theory that white people are being replaced by non-whites largely as a result of feminist stances in Western societies. A guidebook for law enforcement by the Organization for Security and Co-operation in Europe notes that strict and systematic control of gender roles is used as a recruitment tool both by the Islamic State militant group and by Western misogynist extremists among the incel and men's rights movements. Both groups portray men as hyper-masculine warriors and women variously as passive caretakers, sources of sexual gratification, and "the enemy" who must be punished.

Belief in the superiority of the masculine over the feminine is frequently described as a characteristic of fascism by scholars, including Umberto Eco, J. R. McNeill, Kevin Passmore, and Stanley G. Payne. Media researcher Michele White argues that contemporary antifeminism often supports antisemitism and white supremacy, citing the example of the Neo-Nazi websites Stormfront and The Daily Stormer, which often claim that feminism represents a Jewish plot to destroy Western civilization. According to Helen Lewis, the far-right ideology considers it vital to control female reproduction and sexuality: "Misogyny is used predominantly as the first outreach mechanism", where "You were owed something, or your life should have been X, but because of the ridiculous things feminists are doing, you can't access them." Similar strands of thought are found in the incel subculture, which centers around misogynist fantasies about punishing women for not having sex with them.

=== Role of antifeminist women in politics ===
Anti-feminist conservative family and migration policies are pursued by woman-led governments themselves, together with right-wing populist ones. For example, through the narrative of a mother, used by Giorgia Meloni, the Italian prime minister, or by Marine Le Pen, former leader of the National Rally party, who presents herself as the "modern mother of the nation". But this by no means has a feminist approach, because along with right-wing populist approaches, Le Pen also pursues a pro-natalist policy, that does not aim at equality, but rather grants women primarily reproductive functions. However, women with anti-feminism attitudes can take advantage of the fact that a "feminine image" leads to their being perceived as less radical and far-right. Taking advantage of gender-specific attributions would be therefore an important contribution to the normalization and demonization strategy of anti-feminist and far-right approaches.

== See also ==
- Backlash (sociology)
- École Polytechnique massacre
- Feminazi
- Incel
- The Manipulated Man
- Manosphere
- Men's rights movement
- Sexism
- Social justice warrior
