= The Manipulated Man =

Book by Esther Vilar

- Author: Esther Vilar
- Language: English
- Subject: Men's rights, Sexism, Gender studies, Non-fiction
- Publisher: Pinter & Martin
- Publication date: 1971
- Media type: Paperback, Hardcover
- Pages: 155
- ISBN: 978-0-9530964-2-8
- Followed by: The Polygamous Sex

The Manipulated Man (German: Der dressierte Mann) is a 1971 book by author Esther Vilar, originally written in German and translated to English by Eva Borneman. The main idea behind the book is that women are not oppressed by men but rather control men to their advantage. A third edition of the book was released in January 2009.

== Synopsis ==
The book argues that, contrary to common feminist and women's rights rhetoric, women in industrialized cultures are not oppressed, but rather exploit a well-established system of manipulating men.

Vilar writes, "Men have been trained and conditioned by women, not unlike the way Pavlov conditioned his dogs, into becoming their slaves. As compensation for their labours men are given periodic use of a woman's vagina." The book contends that young boys are encouraged to associate their masculinity with their ability to be sexually intimate with a woman, and that a woman can control a man by socially empowering herself to be the gate-keeper to his sense of masculinity. Vilar states that this has been going on for some time.

The author says that social definitions and norms, such as the idea that women are weak, are constructed by women with their needs in mind. Vilar explains how it works: if women are viewed as weak, less is expected of them; and therefore they are given more leeway in society than men. Vilar states that women are generally "gold diggers" who attempt to extract money and other material resources from men. One means by which women control men to effect this transfer of resources is praise. Women dole out praise to men only when their needs are met in some way.

Another means of manipulation is the calculated use of emotional displays. Vilar claims that women can control their emotional reactions whereas men cannot, and that women create overly-dramatized emotional reactions to get their way: they "blackmail" men emotionally. Women also use sex as a tool of manipulation and control but also traditional concepts of love and romance, which are seen more positively than sex, to control men's sexual lives. Vilar writes that men gain nothing from marriage and that women coerce them into it under the pretense that it fulfills their romantic desires.

The book closes with Vilar stating that it would be difficult to change the situation by appealing to women, as women are unsympathetic to the plight of men, and unwilling to give up their comfortable position in society. It is up to men to see past the deception and emotional blackmail and subject it to open criticism before any meaningful changes can occur.

== Reception ==
The Manipulated Man was quite popular at the time of its release, in part due to the considerable press coverage it received.

Vilar appeared on The Tonight Show on February 21, 1973, to discuss her book. In 1975 she was invited to a televised debate by WDR with Alice Schwarzer, who was considered as the leading representative of the women's movement in Germany at that time. The debate provoked controversy, in particular for its high degree of aggression. At one point, for example, Schwarzer claimed Vilar was "not only sexist, but fascist", and compared her book with the Nazi newspaper Der Stürmer.

Vilar stated that she received death threats over the book: "So I hadn't imagined broadly enough the isolation I would find myself in after writing this book. Nor had I envisaged the consequences which it would have for subsequent writing and even for my private life—violent threats have not ceased to this date."

== Sales ==
According to research from the Spanish Book Institute, the Spanish translated version (under the title El Varón Domado) was the third-most popular book sold in Spain in 1975.

== See also ==
- Antifeminism
- Men Going Their Own Way
