= MGTOW =

MGTOW may refer to:

- Maximum gross takeoff weight, a weight limit for aircraft
- Men Going Their Own Way, an anti-feminist online community
