= Divorce mill =

Location chosen for divorce due to preferred processes

A divorce mill is a jurisdiction that is frequently used by non-residents to obtain a divorce quickly. Migratory divorce is the practice of relocating temporarily to another jurisdiction to obtain a divorce. In the early years of the United States, after state legislatures gave courts the authority to grant divorces, some states had more lenient divorce laws than others. Divorce seekers began to travel to other jurisdictions when their home state's requirements were too onerous.

One of the first states to gain a reputation as a divorce mill was Indiana, followed by Illinois, Iowa, the Dakota Territory, and Nevada. When states became popular destinations for migratory divorce, many of the citizenry often protested. In response, some states made their divorce laws and residency requirements stricter, which resulted in divorce seekers moving to other liberal jurisdictions.

Coverage of the wealthy and the scandalous in newspapers often gave the public the perception that many more people were flocking to divorce mills than actually were.

== Background ==
From 1776 to approximately 1850, divorces were granted by state legislatures. As the burden of divorce requests grew, states began to establish laws for divorce and transferred responsibility for granting divorces from the legislature to judicial courts.

Divorce laws across the United States varied greatly in the 1800s. Divorce in New York could only be granted for adultery, while Rhode Island listed 10 offenses for which a divorce could be granted but required 365 days residency. South Carolina only allowed for divorces during a six-year period in the 1870s. Newer states and territories in the west often had permissive divorce statutes and shorter residency requirements.

== Rise of divorce mills ==
Migratory divorce in the United States was practiced from its earliest days. James Kent wrote:

...for many years after New York became an independent state, there was not any lawful mode of dissolving a marriage in the lifetime of the parties, but by a special act of the legislature. This strictness was productive of public inconvenience, and often forced the parties, in cases which rendered a separation fit and necessary, to some other state, to avail themselves of a more easy and certain remedy.

Locations became divorce mills by combining liberal divorce laws with short residency requirements. After the Civil War, lawyers in New York advertised their ability to obtain divorces in other states. Divorce-seekers living in states with stringent divorce laws began to take advantage of more lenient laws in other states by relocating temporarily. Before 1850, migratory divorce-seekers were granted divorces in Connecticut, Rhode Island, Vermont, Maine, Pennsylvania, and Ohio. Indiana established relatively short time requirements for residency and became a popular destination for divorce in the 1850s, as did Illinois in the 1860s and Iowa in the 1870s and 1880s. Reputations for being divorce mills were formed more from newspaper accounts and publicity than from statistical evidence.

The first U.S. state to be labeled a divorce mill was Indiana in the 1850s, which had lenient divorce laws at the time. Migrants were easily able to establish temporary residence. Indiana required only an affidavit that the petitioner was a resident. The Indiana Daily Journal wrote that more than 50 of the 72 divorce actions in Marion County in 1858 were filed by non-residents. The ease of divorce in Indiana was criticized by citizens, including clergy and women's rights groups. The legislature increased the residency requirement to one year in 1859, however, Indiana retained its reputation as a divorce mill. The legislature further restricted its divorce laws in 1873, ending Indiana's easy divorces.

Utah gained a reputation as a divorce mill in the 1850s after an 1852 Utah Territory statute provided an omnibus clause (Note: In the Utah Territory statute, the omnibus clause permitted judges to grant divorces "when it shall be made to appear to the satisfaction and conviction of the courts that the parties cannot live in peace and union together and that their welfare requires a separation".) as grounds for divorce and a residency requirement that a petitioner was "a resident of the Territory, or wishes to be one", allowing for same-day divorces. After 1878, Utah removed its omnibus clause and extended the residence requirement to one year.

In 1867, the territorial legislature for the Dakota Territory set the residency requirement to 90 days and listed numerous causes for divorce. When the territory became two states in 1889, both states retained the grounds for divorce and 90-day requirement. The lenient residency requirement coupled with South Dakota's easier accessibility resulted in it becoming a popular destination for migratory divorces. Sioux Falls, South Dakota, as the hub of multiple major railroad lines, became known as the "Divorce Colony". Many citizens, particularly the clergy, railed against the influx of non-residents seeking divorces. In 1893, South Dakota's state legislature extended the residency requirement for divorce to six months, and required residency for one year when the defendant could not be personally served. Divorce-seekers began to move instead to North Dakota, which still had only a three-month residency requirement. Fargo, in particular, gained a reputation as a divorce mill by the mid-1890s. After several years of debate, North Dakota extended its residency requirement to one year in 1899.

After the Dakotas extended their residency requirements, lawyers advertised the six-month residency requirement of Wyoming and it was a popular destination for divorces until its residence period was extended to one year in 1901.

Nevada's six-month residence requirement resulted in Reno becoming the primary destination for migratory divorce in the early 1900s. Pressured by protests, the legislature extended the residency requirement to one year in 1913, only to reverse it in 1915 under pressure from businesspeople. By the 1930s, the residence requirement had been reduced to six weeks. Recognizing, as Nevada did, that migratory divorce provided financial benefits to the state, other states in the 1930s sought to attract divorce-seekers: Idaho, Arkansas, Wyoming, and Florida.

Migratory divorces were not only engaged in by Americans. In 1900, Frank Russell, 2nd Earl Russell, temporarily relocated from England to Lake Tahoe to obtain a Nevada divorce and immediately remarried. (Note: Upon return to England, Russell was found guilty of bigamy and imprisoned.)

In the 1920s, wealthier Americans began seeking divorce decrees in Paris. Approximately 300 American couples obtained French divorces in 1926. Through stricter enforcement of laws, French courts reduced the flow of American migratory divorce-seekers, and only 25 were granted to Americans in 1934.

Mexico, where a divorce might be granted in a single day, grew in popularity as a destination. Travel bureaus offered packaged "divorce tours" to Mexico. Mail order divorces from Mexico, though sometimes spurious and generally invalid if challenged in an American court, became a thriving business. Haiti and Guam also became known as divorce mills.

California's adoption of no-fault divorce in the 1970s quickly spread to other states. By the mid-1980s, migratory divorce was motivated by a desire to find a jurisdiction that would provide the most favorable financial, property, and custody awards, rather than seeking a jurisdiction with more lenient grounds for divorce as before.

== Incidence ==
A 1889 report from the federal Commissioner of Labor found that people who married in one state and divorced in another only constituted around 20 percent of divorces. The report, taking into consideration the mobile nature of the American populace, speculated that perhaps 3 to 10 percent of that 20 percent could be attributed to migratory divorce. Samuel Warren Dike, founder of the Divorce Reform League, concluded that less than 10 percent of divorces were migratory, based on the 1889 report.

In 1932, it was estimated that only 3 to 5 percent of divorces were migratory. The publicity given to wealthy and famous people who sought Nevada divorces gave the impression that migratory divorces were more common than they actually were, with Nevada contributing only 1 divorce per 50 across the country in 1940.

Felix Frankfurter wrote in a dissenting Supreme Court opinion Sherrer v. Sherrer, 334 U.S. 343 (1948):

Actually, there are but five States, Arkansas, Florida, Idaho, Nevada, and Wyoming, in which divorces may be easily obtained on less than a year's residence...These five States accounted for only 24,370 divorces in 1940, but 9% of the national total...The number of divorces granted in Arkansas, Idaho, and Wyoming is small enough to indicate the normal incidence of divorce among their permanent population, with only a few transients taking advantage of their divorce laws. Nevada and Florida thus attract virtually all of the non-resident divorce business. Yet, between them, only 16,375 divorces were granted in 1940, 6% of the total.

The numbers of Americans seeking Mexican divorces fluctuated:

- 1935: estimated 1700
- 1940: less than 900
- 1945: almost 3000
- 1950: estimated 1500
- 1955: estimated 4300

The U.S. Department of Health, Education, and Welfare estimated that there were 19,000 migratory divorces in 1960 (not including divorces obtained in other countries), 4.8 percent of the national total.

== Legal issues ==
At issue was whether a state had to recognize a divorce granted by another state. States had the right to regulate marital status for their citizens, but they were also bound by Article Four of the United States Constitution.

Several cases involving migratory divorce, such as Andrews v. Andrews (1903), Haddock v. Haddock (1906), and Williams v. North Carolina (1942), reached the U.S. Supreme Court.

Andrews v. Andrews involved the estate of Charles Andrews and was brought by his first wife (Kate) against his second wife (Annie). Charles had obtained a divorce from Kate in 1892 after living in Sioux Falls for more than 90 days, and then married Annie eight months later. He died in 1897 and a probate court made Annie the administrator of his estate. Kate appealed the decision, claiming that the Sioux Falls divorce was not valid. The Supreme Judicial Court of Massachusetts agreed, citing an 1835 Massachusetts law:

When any inhabitant of this state shall go into any other state or country, in order to obtain a divorce for any cause, which had occurred here, and whilst the parties resided here, or for any cause, which would not authorize a divorce, by the laws of this state, a divorce so obtained shall be of no force or effect in this state.

The U. S. Supreme Court upheld the finding of the Massachusetts court.

In Haddock v. Haddock, the court found that the couple's domicile was New York and thus the divorce the husband obtained in Connecticut could be rejected by the New York courts. After that decision, some lesser courts applied the marital domicile principle established in the case, while other judges based their decisions on residency requirements so long as the party had not established residency solely for the purpose of obtaining a divorce.

In Williams v. North Carolina, Lillie Hendrix and Otis Williams, both married residents of North Carolina, had relocated to Las Vegas. After six weeks residency in Nevada, each obtained a divorce. Hendrix and Williams then married each other and returned to North Carolina where they were charged with bigamy and sentenced to two years in prison. The Supreme Court of North Carolina upheld the conviction, but the Supreme Court ruled that North Carolina had to grant full faith and credit to the Nevada decrees, overturning the verdict from Haddock v. Haddock. The court reexamined the case in 1945, with North Carolina arguing that six weeks in a motel did not constitute valid residence, and the court ruled that North Carolina did not have to grant full faith and credit to the Nevada decrees because a genuine domicile had not been established in Nevada.
