= Edward Hammond Clarke =

American physician (1820 – 1877)

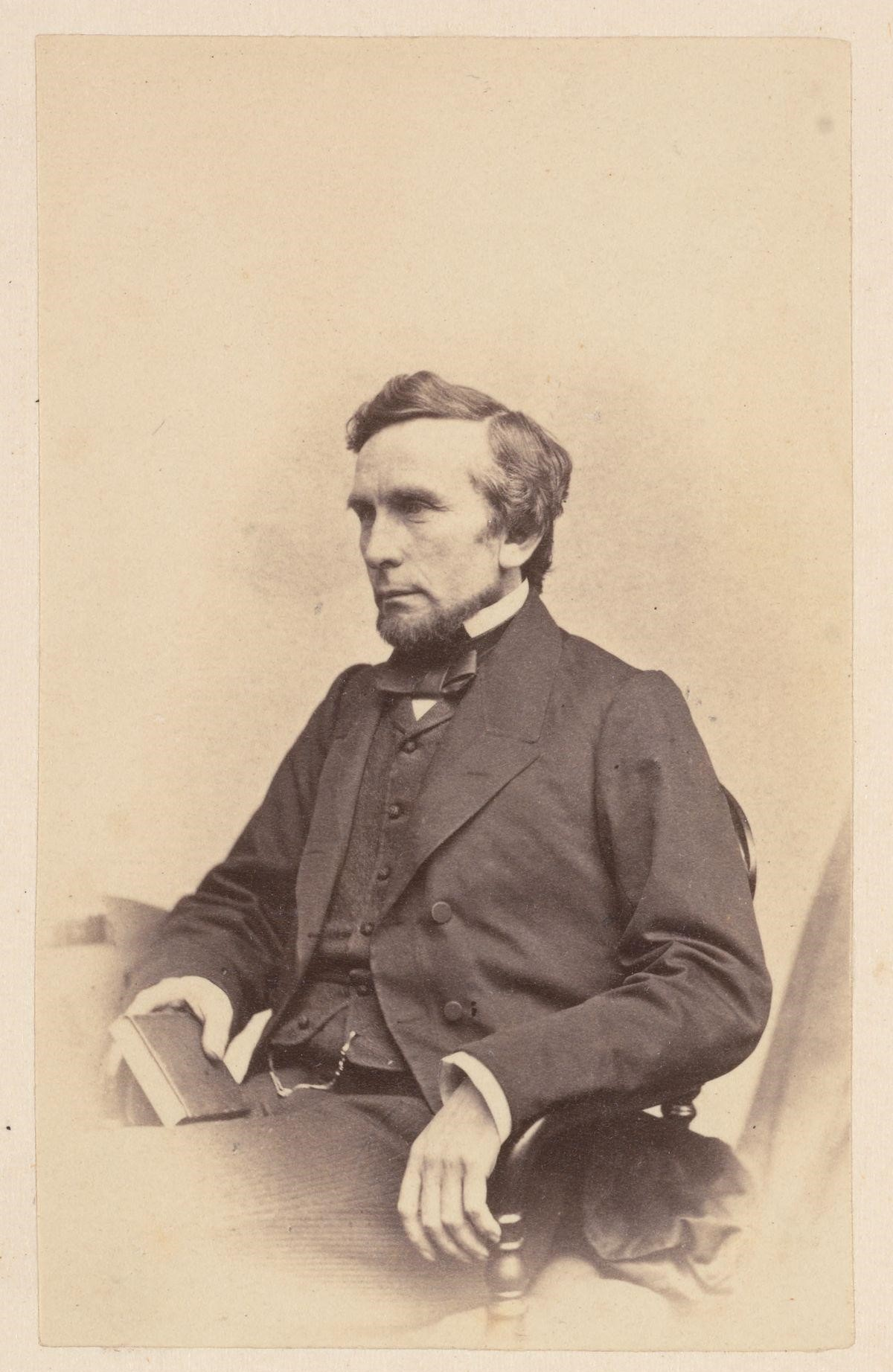
- Unknown photographer, Edward Hammond Clarke, c. 1868. Harvard University Archives, Harvard Class of 1868 Album.
- Born: February 2, 1820; Norton, Massachusetts
- Died: November 30, 1877 (aged 57); Boston, Massachusetts
- Occupations: Medical professor and physician
- Parent: Reverend Pitt Clarke (father) Mary Jones Clarke (mother)
- Relatives: Major Jacob Clarke (uncle) William Clarke

Academic background
- Education: University of Pennsylvania Medical School

Academic work
- Institutions: Harvard Medical School
- Notable works: Sex in Education; or, A Fair Chance for Girls (1873)

Edward Hammond Clarke (February 2, 1820 – November 30, 1877) was a Harvard Medical School professor (1855-1872) and medical doctor. He caused controversy in 1873 following the publication of his book Sex in Education; or, a Fair Chance for Girls, in which he argued that women were inherently less physically and intellectually capable than men. He claimed that a woman's health would deteriorate as a result of higher education, and moreover that the education of women would come at the expense of their reproductive health. He was not alone in holding such antifeminist views at a time when women were asserting their right to higher education. His claims were notably rebutted by physician Mary Putnam Jacobi in 1876.

== Biography ==
=== Early life and education ===
Born in Norton, Massachusetts, he was the fourth and youngest child of Reverend Pitt Clarke and Mary Jones Clarke. His father graduated from Harvard College and was a Minister of the First Congregational Society in Norton for forty-two years. His mother was known for writing many poems. His family home was listed on the National Register of Historic Places on July 13, 1976. Clarke's uncle was Major Jacob Clarke, a building contractor who built the Allin Congregational Church.

Clarke went to Harvard College for his undergraduate studies. During his junior year, he suffered a haemorrhage in the lungs and became so ill that he could not attend Commencement and was unable to obtain honours for his studies, despite being first in his class. He concluded his undergraduate studies in 1841. After Harvard, he decided to pursue a medical career and enrolled in the University of Pennsylvania Medical School. He received his M.D. in 1846 and subsequently spent time travelling in Europe, where he studied otology.

=== Medical practice ===
On his return from Europe, Clarke practiced medicine in Boston, specializing in otology and general practice. He was regarded highly as a physician and well known for his expertise in otology although he later gave up the specialization to focus on general practice. His popularity with upper middle class patients grew as he became more well-known. Clarke was said to have personable qualities and was described as having an “inquiring, observant, reflective, and judicial” mind suitable for medical practice. Since he did not wish to disclose information about his patients to the public, most of Clarke's patient records were destroyed after his death.

Clarke became the Professor of Materia medica at Harvard Medical School in 1855, a position he held until 1872. Though he ostensibly stepped down due to ill health, throughout the 1870s he continued to write about his views as a physician on subjects that interested him, especially of a sociological nature. Clarke had several publications, including Sex in Education; or, A Fair Chance for Girls (1873), The Building of a Brain (1874), and Visions: A Study of False Sight (1878) published posthumously with an introduction by Oliver Wendell Holmes Sr.

=== Views on education ===
Clarke shared his views on education for women when he was invited to speak at the New England Women's Club of Boston in 1872. Although he claimed that women should be allowed to learn whatever they could, he doubted women had the same ability to succeed as men. In fact, he believed that women's educational capacity was limited by their physiology. The members of the Women's Club were shocked by Clarke's contention about the alleged intrinsic inferiority of women's potential for education compared to men.

Clarke claimed that letting women follow the same education as men would cause harm to their reproductive organs. His views were not uncommon at the time. Many physicians, such as the gynaecologist Thomas A. Emmet and the neurologist S. Weir Mitchell, also disapproved of letting women pursue the same strenuous education as men. However, some women rights activists, such as Emma Willard, fought for equality in education. Throughout America, women in higher education institutions condemned Clarke's writing. Some who agreed with Clarke that women were not as physically and intellectually capable as men, nevertheless supported their access to higher education in the belief that they could meet its intellectual rigours.

Clarke and other antifeminists tried to use Darwinism to justify their beliefs in the inherent biological differences between the sexes. However, they could not justify their arguments against higher education for women empirically since women's access to it had only just begun and there was insufficient data, if any, relating to the effect of higher education on women's health.

=== Publication ===
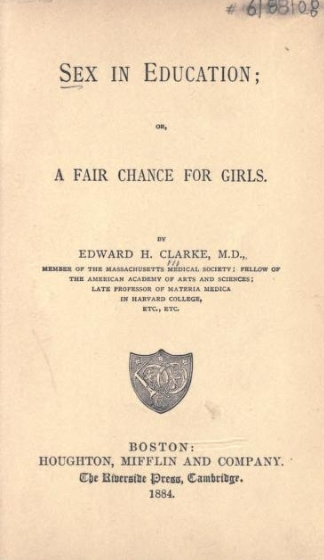
Title page from the 1884 reprint of Sex in Education.

Clarke expanded his talk in a 1873 publication entitled Sex in Education; or, A Fair Chance for Girls, where he discussed his views on the education of boys and girls. The book was so popular that it sold out in a week. Clarke's views caused great controversy, especially among women's rights activists. In the 1870s, education was a much-debated topic, especially education for women. People at the time thought education for girls should differ from that for boys. Clarke argued that girls would not be able to cope with the “intellectual demands traditionally placed on boys” and that imposing such demands on them during puberty would lead to “physiological disasters,” such as “nervous collapse and sterility.” To support his claims he cited the cases of seven women whose health condition deteriorated apparently as a result of "arduous" studies in college. For example, one of the women who had gone to Vassar College and was referred to Dr. Clarke, was depicted by him as “neuralgic and hysterical.”

==== Notable rebuttal by Jacobi ====
Mary Putnam Jacobi responded to Clarke's ideas in an essay, eventually published as a book, called The Question of Rest for Women during Menstruation; Jacobi collected extensive physiological data on women throughout their menstrual cycle, including muscle strength tests before and after menstruation. She concluded that "there is nothing in the nature of menstruation to imply the necessity, or even desirability, of rest." In 1876, Jacobi received Harvard University's Boylston Prize or her work, the first woman to win the prize.

=== Death ===
Clarke was diagnosed with cancer in the lower part of his intestine and died in 1877.

== See also ==
- Antifeminism
- Eliza Bisbee Duffey
