= Klaus Wagn =

German author (born 1937)

Klaus Wagn (born 1937) is a German author and former husband of Argentine-German writer Esther Vilar. They were married for 14 years (1961–1975) and they had a son named Martin in 1963. Vilar said in 1975 they had a divorce, but claimed: "I didn't break up with the man, just with marriage as an institution."

== Works ==
- Gottesgott by Klaus Wagn (1966)
- Das Lust-an-der-Unfreiheit-Modell by Klaus Wagn (1969)
- Bewußtsein als eine Struktur von Zeit by Klaus Wagn (1970)
- Entwurf einer allgemeinen Theorie des Bewußtseins/Design of a General Theory of Consciousness (bilingual edition) by Klaus Wagn (1971)
- Was Zeit ist und was nicht (German Edition of "What Time Does") by Klaus Wagn (1975)
- What time does by Klaus Wagn (1976)
- Herrschaft der Natur? by Klaus Wagn (2000)
- Bewusstsein und Wirklichkeit by Klaus Wagn (2002)
- Herr der Zeit by Klaus Wagn (2004)
