= Eliza Bisbee Duffey =

American painter, author, newspaper editor and printer, spiritualist and feminist

- Born: Eliza Bisbee; 1838
- Died: 1898 (aged 59–60)
- Occupation(s): Writer, editor, painter
- Spouse: John B. Duffey

Eliza Bisbee Duffey (1838–1898) was an American painter, author, poet, newspaper editor and printer, columnist, spiritualist, and feminist who published several books in defense of women's rights.

== Early life ==
Duffey was born to Cordelia and Charles A. Bisbee and raised in Geauga County, Ohio. While in Ohio she spent her early years working for The Jeffersonian Democrat as a printer. After moving to Columbus, Ohio to help edit the publication The Alliance, she met her husband, John B. Duffey.

From 1861 to 1867 the Duffeys resided in Philadelphia. While there Eliza Bisbee Duffey exhibited her paintings at the Pennsylvania Academy of the Fine Arts where she eventually became an Associate Member. By 1867, the Duffeys were living in Woodbury, New Jersey until relocating to Vineland, New Jersey in 1872 where she and her husband became editors and publishers of The Vineland Daily Times in 1877.

Eliza was a strong advocate for equality between men and women. She published several essays and books about female sexual health and education, education for women, gender roles and the ideal world for both men and women. These works have influenced many reformers and advocates after her.

== Writing ==
As an ardent feminist in the Victorian era, Eliza Bisbee Duffey made waves with her pro-female writing. As a writer she engaged Edward Hammond Clarke in a debate on educating females. Clarke wrote an extremely popular book entitled Sex in Education; or, A Fair Chance for the Girls in which he argued against educating women in the same environment as men due to their supposed intellectual disadvantages. Duffey responded to Clarke's arguments with her book No Sex in Education (1874) in which she advocated for the equal and co-education of both genders.

Duffey continued to take controversial stances. The next topic she tackled was the relationship between men and women. In her book The Relations of the Sexes (1876), she discussed a myriad of topics from the biology of each of the sexes to problems faced by women in marriage. One of the boldest proclamations she made in her book was on the issue of non-consensual sex in marriage. She believed that marital rape was a real crime being committed and that it should be seen as equal to other forms of rape. In addition, she discussed spousal abuse of women and argued that brutality should be sufficient grounds for divorce. She continued this assertion in many of her writings and in one of her articles, she went so far as to say that a woman was "no more bound to yield her body to her husband after the marriage between them, than she was before, until she feels that she can do so with the full tide of willingness and affection." In continuation, her work and writing in The Relations of the Sexes (1876) illustrated how changing ideas in science impacted society's views on once-popular opinions. For instance, she takes a stand against the notion of quickening, and claims that it does not represent a proper view of human gestation.

Just one year after publishing The Relations of the Sexes, Duffey continued to write about her views on society with her 1877 book, The Ladies' and Gentlemen's Etiquette. In this book she discusses the proper etiquette for 35 different situations in which an individual may find themselves. This book, though straightforward in its content, has a sharp introduction in which Duffey affirms that women should have a higher place in society.

Later in life, Duffey became interested in spiritualism and although she claimed to have little knowledge of the field, she wrote Heaven Revised (1889) through the technique of automatic writing.

== Painting ==
Duffey was also a still life painter.

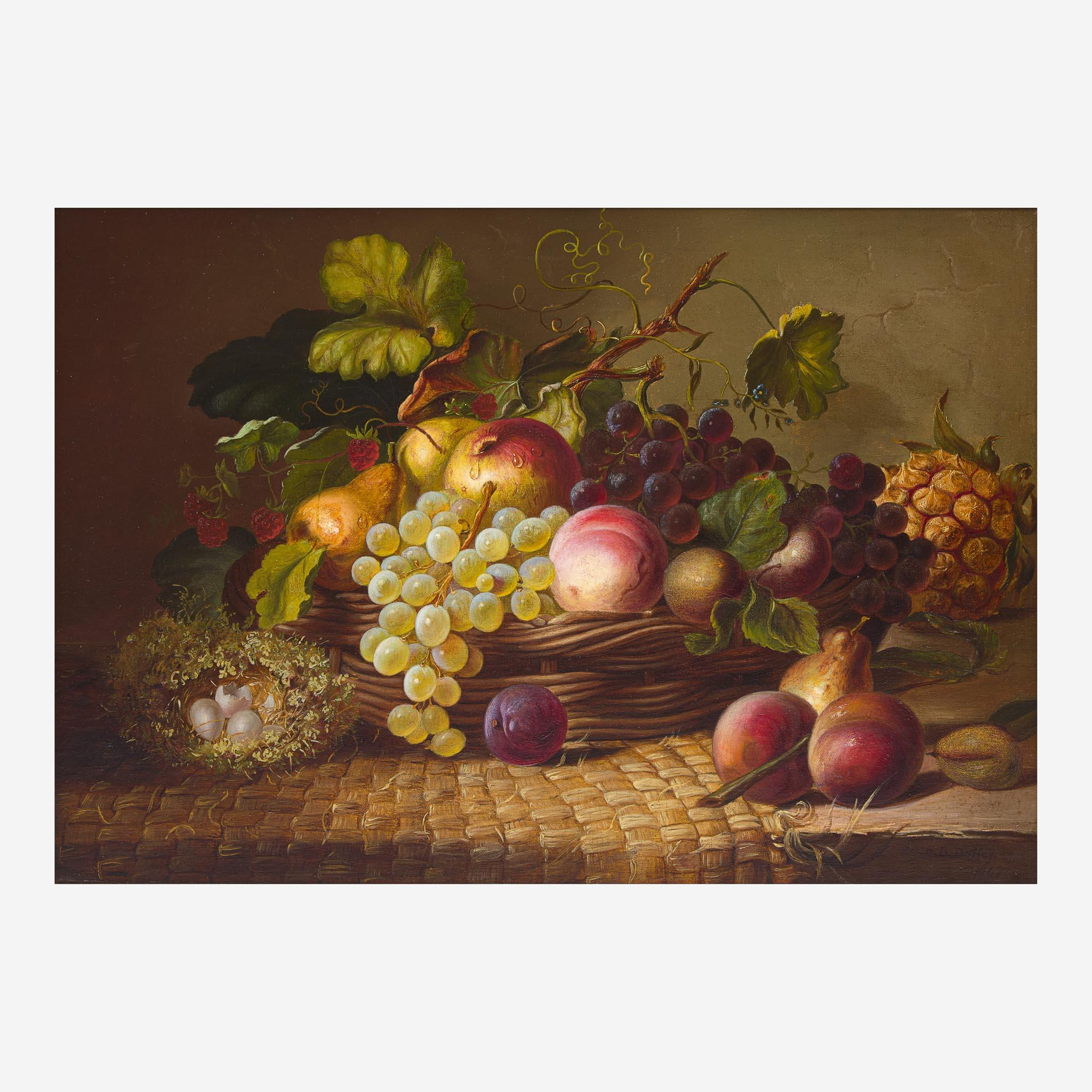

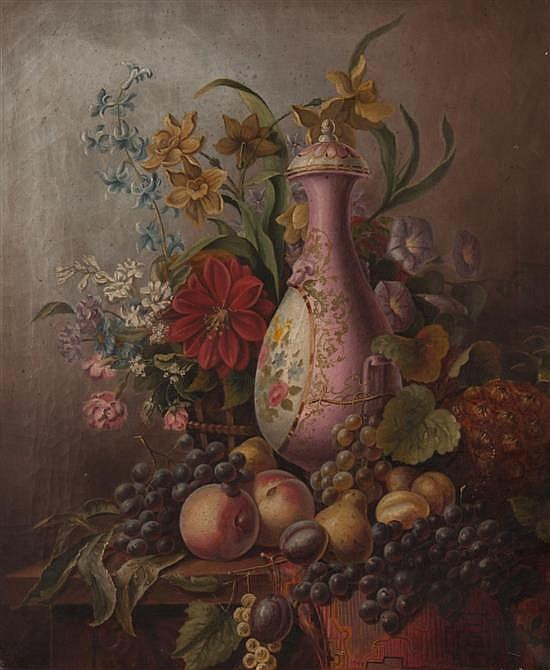

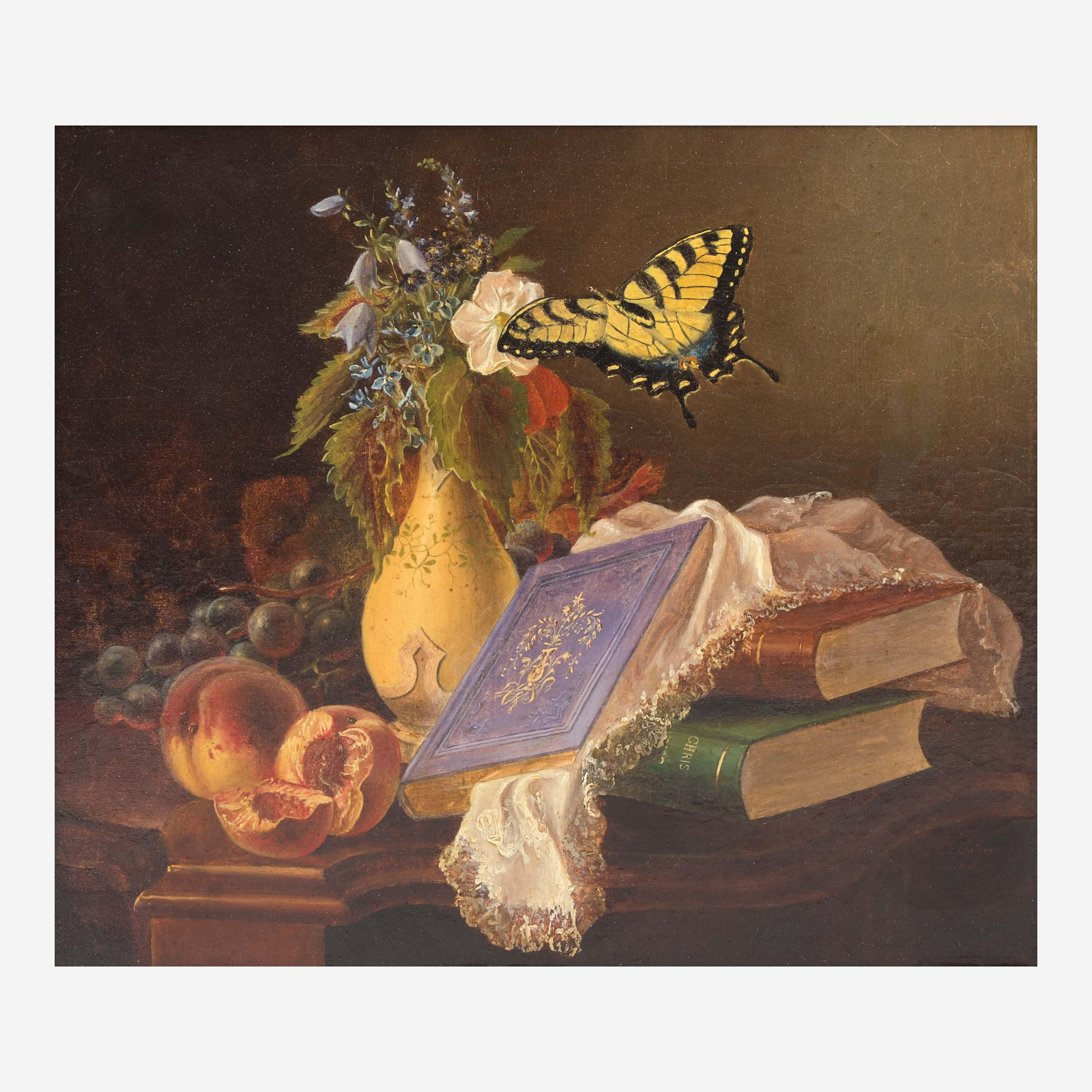

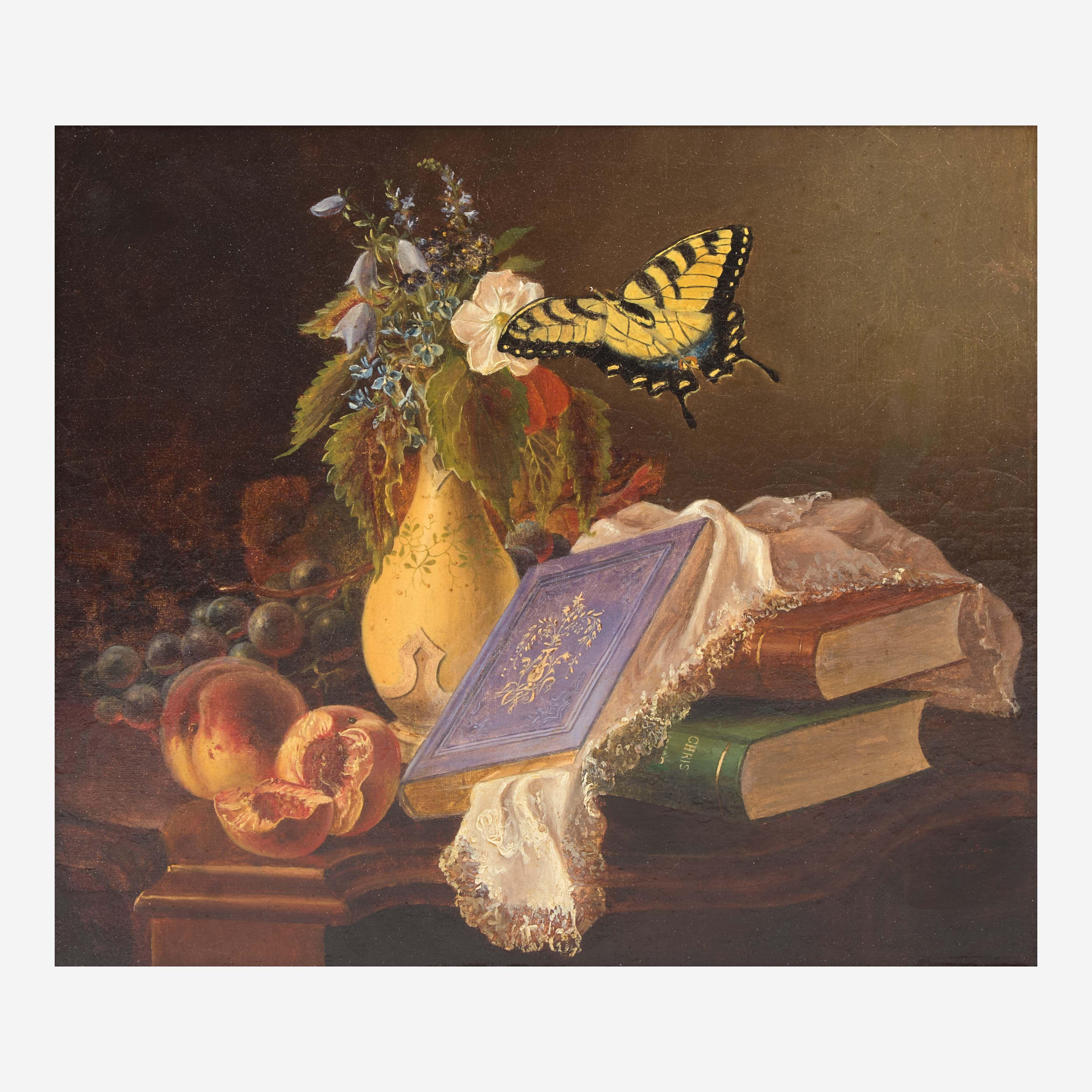
