= George Lawrence Clarke Jr. House =

Historic house in Wisconsin, United States

- George Lawrence Jr. Clarke House
- U.S. National Register of Historic Places
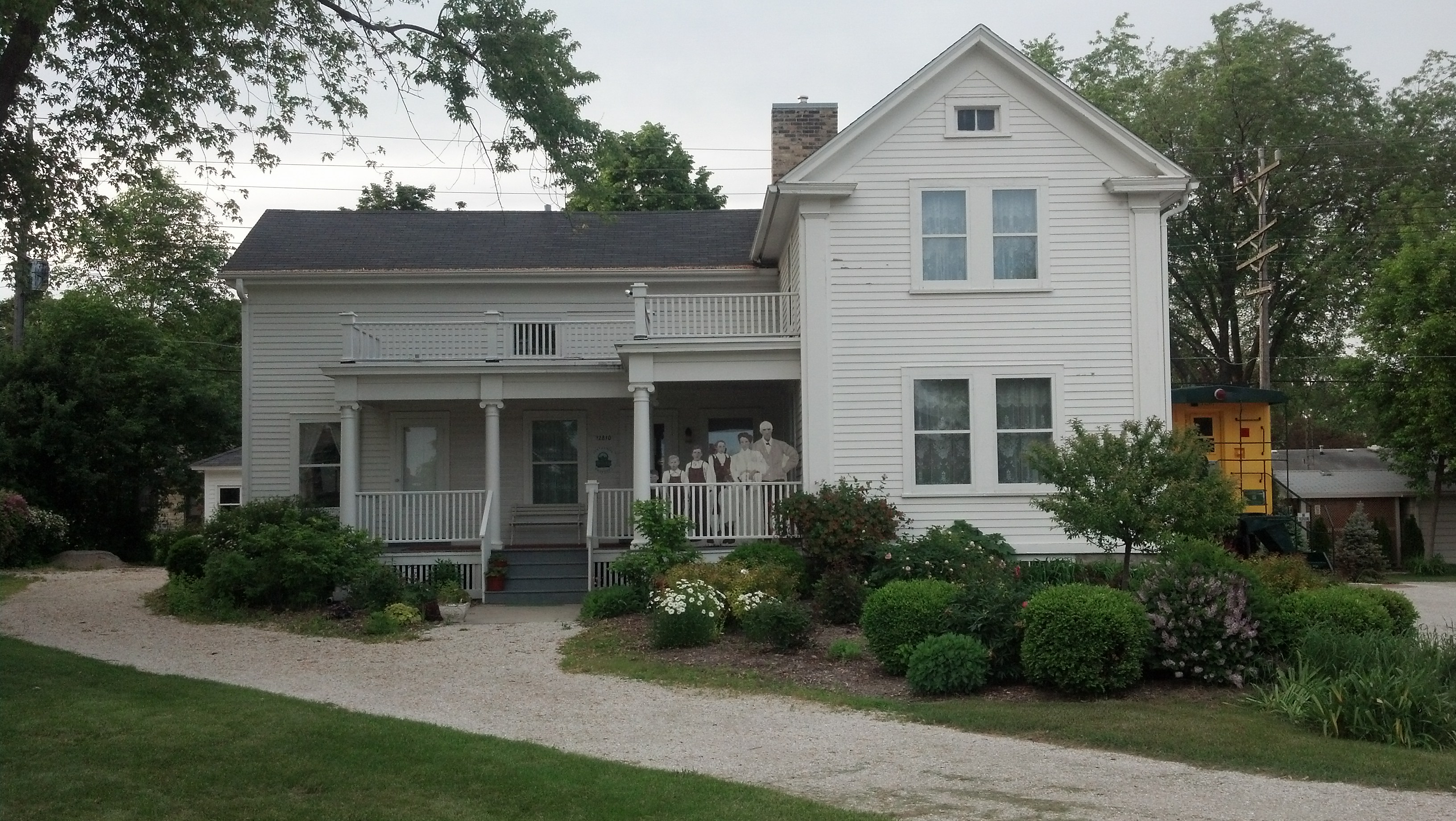
- George Lawrence Clarke Jr. House
- Location: 12810 W. Hampton Ave., Butler, Waukesha County, Wisconsin
- Coordinates: 43°06′19″N 88°04′21″W
- Area: less than one acre
- Built: 1850
- Architectural style: Greek Revival
- NRHP reference No.: 95000138
- Added to NRHP: February 24, 1995

The George Lawrence Clarke Jr. House is located in Butler, Waukesha County, Wisconsin.

== History ==
Originally, George Lawrence Clarke Jr. built the house as part of a new farmstead on property that had been his father's. The house has since been moved in order to save it from being demolished when the farmstead was being redeveloped to serve as a railroad yard. It was added to the State Register of Historic Places in 1994 and to the National Register of Historic Places the following year.
