= Clarke–Hobbs–Davidson House =

Historic house in North Carolina, United States

- U.S. National Register of Historic Places
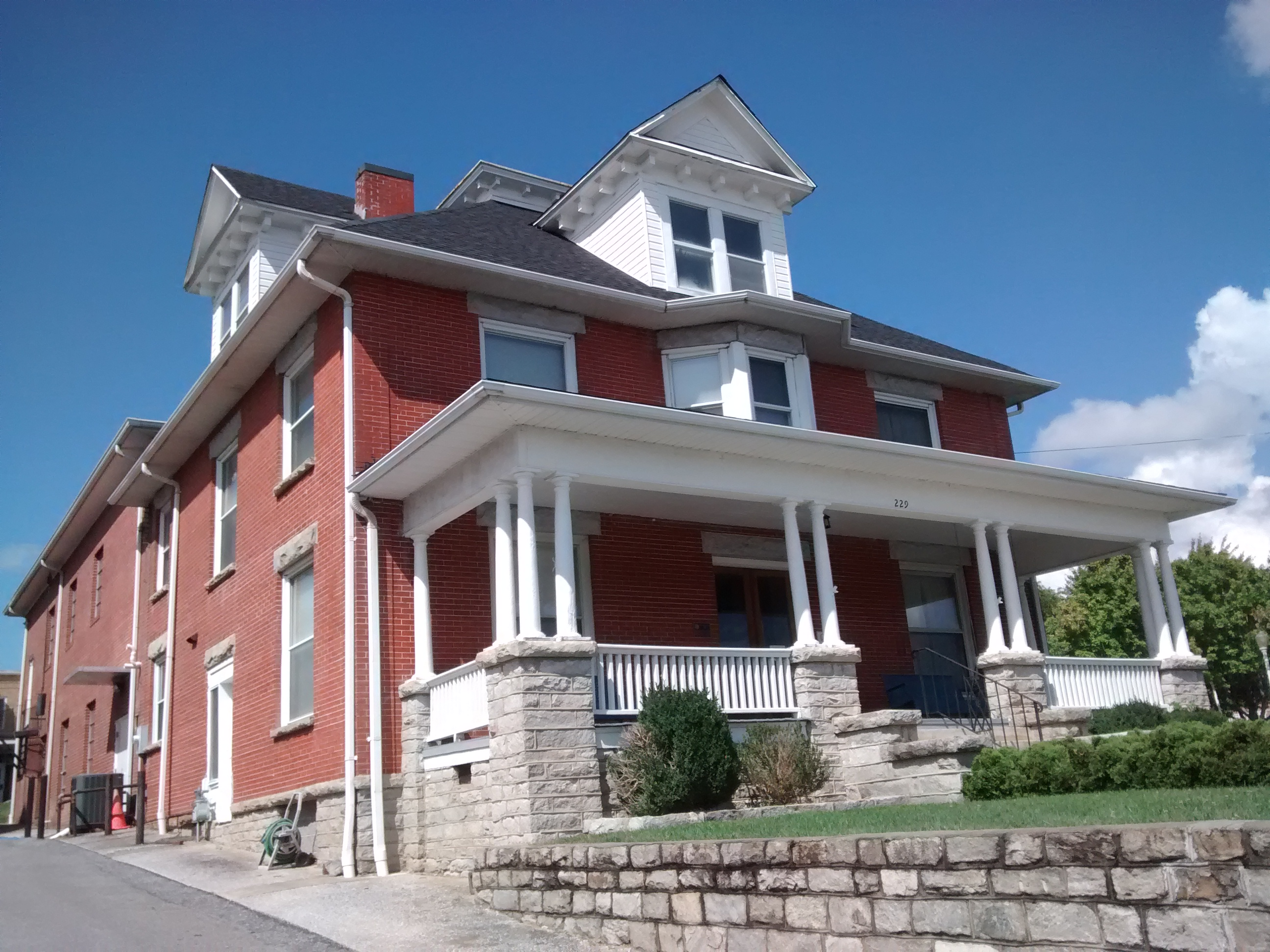
- Clarke–Hobbs–Davidson House, September 2014

- Location within North Carolina Location within the United States
- Location: 229 5th Ave. West, Hendersonville, North Carolina
- Coordinates: 35°19′4″N 82°27′44″W
- Area: 0.4 acres (0.16 ha)
- Built: c. 1907
- Architectural style: Colonial Revival, Queen Anne
- MPS: Hendersonville MPS
- NRHP reference No.: 89000031
- Added to NRHP: February 24, 1989

The Clarke–Hobbs–Davidson House, also known as the Masonic Temple and Charles A. Hobbs House, is a historic home located at Hendersonville, Henderson County, North Carolina. It was built about 1907, and is a two-story, brick, transitional Queen Anne/Colonial Revival-style dwelling. A rear brick addition was built about 1958, after it was acquired by the Masons for use as a Masonic Lodge. It features a one-story hip roofed full-width porch and a tall deck-on-hip roof.

It was listed on the National Register of Historic Places in 1989.
