= Pitt Clarke House =

Historic house in Massachusetts, United States

- U.S. National Register of Historic Places
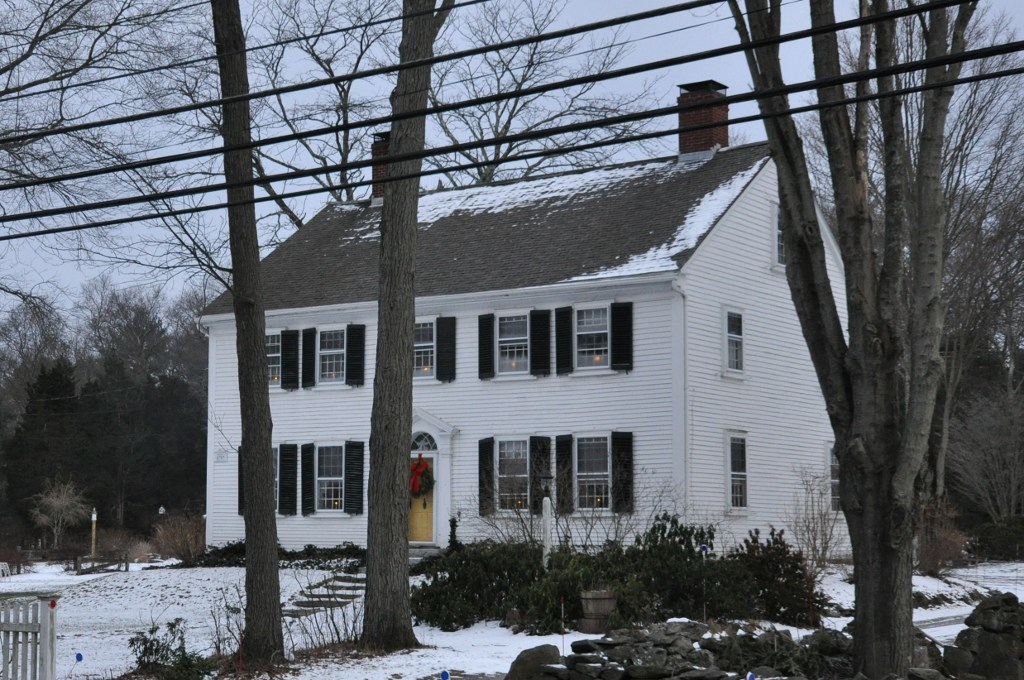

- Location within Massachusetts Location within the United States
- Location: 42 Mansfield Ave., Norton, Massachusetts
- Coordinates: 41°58′13″N 71°11′40″W
- Built: 1797
- Architectural style: Georgian
- NRHP reference No.: 76000230
- Added to NRHP: July 13, 1976

The Pitt Clarke House is a historic house located in Norton, Massachusetts.

== Description and history ==
The 2 1/2-story, Georgian style, wood-framed house was built in 1797 for the Reverend Pitt Clarke, who served as the town's minister for 42 years. The house's main facade is symmetrically arranged, five bays wide, with a center entry that has pilasters supporting a gabled pediment, and a fanlight above the door. The interior has well-preserved woodwork and original fireplaces.

The house was listed on the National Register of Historic Places on July 13, 1976.

== Clarke family ==
Pitt Clarke, who was born in 1763 and died in 1834, was the father of Edward Hammond Clarke of Harvard Medical School. He was the older brother of Major Jacob Clarke and would frequently preach in the First Church and Parish in Dedham.

== See also ==
- National Register of Historic Places listings in Bristol County, Massachusetts
