= James F. Clarke House =

Historic house in Iowa, United States

- U.S. National Register of Historic Places
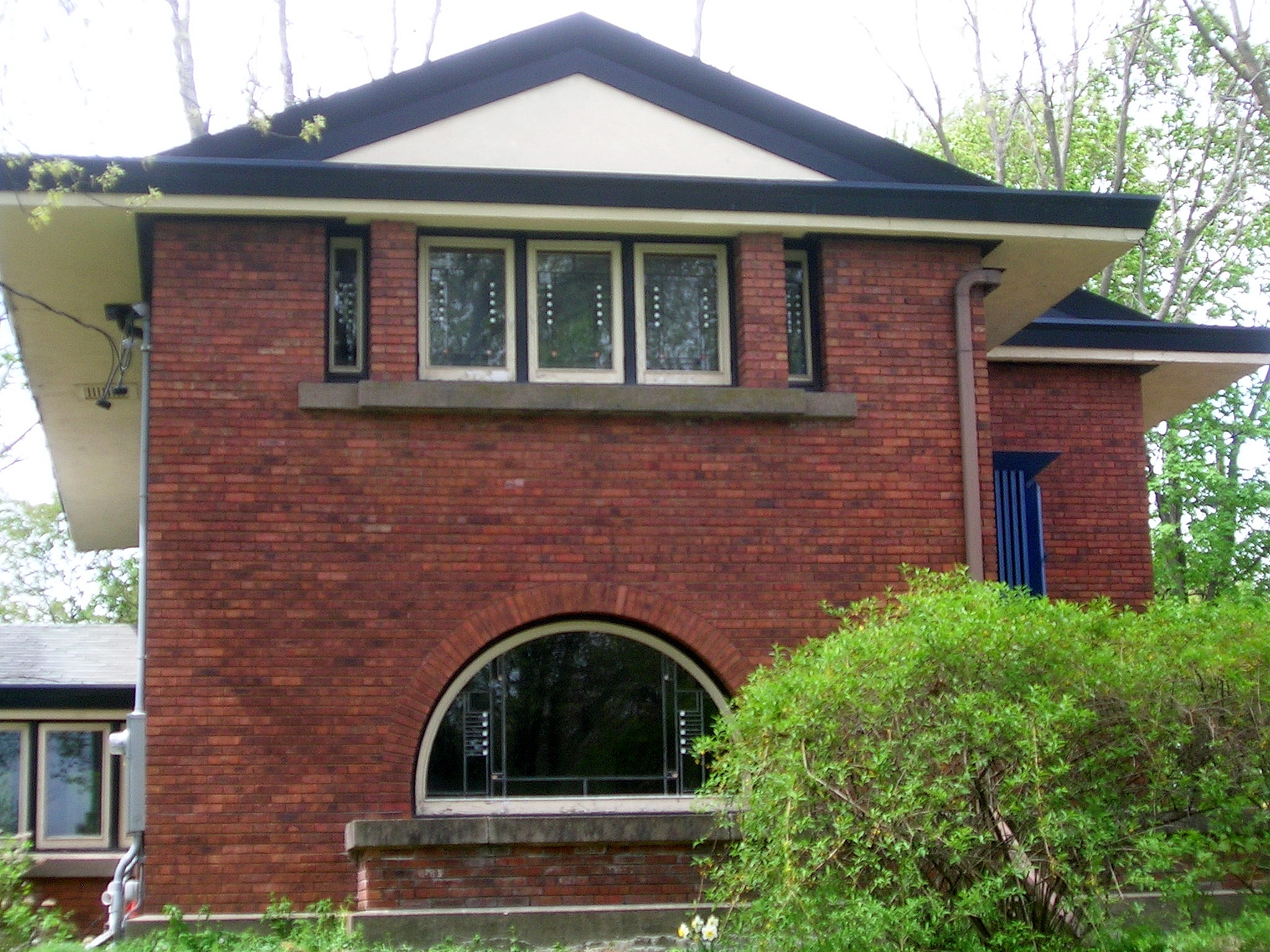

- Location within Iowa Location within the United States
- Location: 500 S. Main St., Fairfield, Iowa
- Coordinates: 41°0′10″N 91°57′51″W
- Area: less than one acre
- Built: 1916
- Architect: Francis Barry Byrne
- Architectural style: Prairie School
- NRHP reference No.: 80001453
- Added to NRHP: February 8, 1980

The James F. Clarke House is a historic building located in Fairfield, Iowa, United States. This Prairie School house was built for Dr. Clarke in 1916. It was designed by Francis Barry Byrne, a student of Frank Lloyd Wright. Byrne was a part of the Prairie School until its demise, and this house shows his movement away from its formal expression, but not its ideals. The two-story brick structure is capped with a low-pitched gable roof. It follows the idiom's use of open and flowing plans, but deviates in its use of simpler decorative forms and De Stijl-like colors. The windows, doors and baseboards are all plain and flat. Clarke was one of the first people in Jefferson County to own an automobile, and the house has one of the first attached garages. It was listed on the National Register of Historic Places in 1980.
