= Clarke Farm Site =

Archaeological site in Ohio, United States

- U.S. National Register of Historic Places
- Nearest city: Point Pleasant, Ohio
- Area: 20 acres (8.1 ha)
- NRHP reference No.: 74001420
- Added to NRHP: November 19, 1974

The Clarke Farm Site is an ancient archaeological site in the southwestern part of the U.S. state of Ohio. Located near Point Pleasant in Clermont County, it is a heavily stratified site, with nearly 8,000 years of occupation. Excavations at the site have yielded a large number of artifacts, including bones, chert, pottery, and shells. Cultures represented at the site range from Early Archaic to Fort Ancient, along with various Woodland cultures. The site encompasses an area of approximately 20 acres (8.1 ha), located along Big Indian Creek.

Because of the wide range of artifacts from so many cultures present at Clarke Farm, it has been recognized as a premier archaeological site. It is believed that the evidence of multiple cultures in succession at the site may contribute to an understanding of the succession of various cultures in the region. The archaeological value of the site led to its placement on the National Register of Historic Places in 1974.
