= Edwin W. and Charlotte Clarke House =

Historic house in New York, United States

- U.S. National Register of Historic Places
- Location within New York Location within the United States
- Location: 80 E. Mohawk St., Oswego, New York
- Coordinates: 43°27′24″N 76°30′2″W
- Area: less than one acre
- Built: 1857
- Architectural style: Italianate
- MPS: Freedom Trail, Abolitionism, and African American Life in Central New York MPS
- NRHP reference No.: 02000052
- Added to NRHP: February 26, 2002

Edwin W. and Charlotte Clarke House is a historic home located at Oswego in Oswego County, New York. It is a 2 1/2-story brick Italianate style residence built in 1857. Edwin W. and Charlotte Clarke were prominent abolitionists and it is believed that the house was a way station on the Underground Railroad.

It was listed on the National Register of Historic Places in 2002.
