= Men Going Their Own Way =

Anti-feminist and male-separatist community

MGTOW logo as shown in the episode "Men at War" of the BBC series Reggie Yates' Extreme UK

Men Going Their Own Way (MGTOW; /ˈmɪɡtaʊ/) is an anti-feminist, misogynistic, mostly online community that espouses male separatism from what they see as a gynocentric society that has been corrupted by feminism. MGTOW specifically advocate for men to avoid marriage and committed romantic relationships with women. The community is a part of the manosphere, a collection of anti-feminist websites and online communities that also includes men's rights activists, incels, and pickup artists.

The early members of MGTOW were largely politically libertarian and focused on individual self-reliance. Like other manosphere communities, MGTOW overlaps with the neoreactionary alt-right movement and has been implicated in online harassment of women and domestic terrorism in the United States. The Southern Poverty Law Center categorizes MGTOW as a part of the male supremacist ideology.

== History ==
MGTOW ideology emerged in the early 2000s, although it is not clear where it originated. A blog called No Ma'am was one of the first sites dedicated to the ideology, publishing a "MGTOW Manifesto" in 2001. Early members of MGTOW were largely politically libertarian and focused on individual self-reliance in accordance with traditional notions of masculinity. Over time, the movement's focus shifted toward male separatism.

Far-right commentator and polemicist Milo Yiannopoulos is credited with helping to popularize MGTOW with a 2014 Breitbart article titled "The Sexodus", in which he described men who were eschewing women, love, sex, and marriage because of feminism. MGTOW discussion forums include the subreddit r/MGTOW, created in 2011, smaller auxiliary subreddits, and MGTOW Forum, an independent website that emerged in 2014. Following Reddit's 2017 ban of a large incel subreddit, r/MGTOW was briefly the largest and most active manosphere forum on the site.

Researchers have implicated MGTOW communities in online harassment of women. r/MGTOW and MGTOW Forum are among the communities which "have been growing in size and in their involvement in online harassment and real-world violence", according to computer scientist Manoel Horta Ribeiro and colleagues. Communications researcher Scott Wright and colleagues state that "MGTOW propagate extensive and wide-ranging passive or undirected harassment and misogyny on Twitter." Shortly after publication of a 2020 preprint of a paper examining manosphere groups online, Reddit quarantined r/MGTOW, a restriction the platform applies to subreddits determined to be "extremely offensive or upsetting to the average redditor" which prevents them from earning advertising revenue and requires visitors to agree to seeing potentially offensive content before entering. r/MGTOW was banned in August 2021 for breaking the site's policies against promotion of violence and hate.

== Membership ==
Members of MGTOW communities are primarily heterosexual, white, middle-class men from North America and Europe. Unlike the men's rights movement, MGTOW do not permit women to join. MGTOW often disavow hierarchies and claim to be leaderless; some deny that MGTOW is a group or movement at all, instead emphasizing each member's individuality and independence within a collective.

Researcher Callum Jones and colleagues write in New Media & Society that "while the precise number of MGTOW followers is unclear, it appears to be a popular and growing group within the Manosphere". As of 2018, MGTOW was smaller than both the men's rights movement and the pickup artist communities online, with MGTOW Forum having over 25,000 subscribers and the subreddit r/MGTOW having over 35,000. The subreddit had grown to 104,000 members by 2019, (Note: The subreddit r/MGTOW was banned in 2021 for promoting hate on the site.) with another MGTOW forum listing over 32,000 members.

== Ideology ==
MGTOW advocate for men to withdraw from what they see as a gynocentric society that has been corrupted by feminism. MGTOW believe that men are better off avoiding any relationships with women, including marriage. Instead, the group believes that men should either abstain from sex with women entirely, or alternatively only have casual sex while avoiding romantic or financial commitments. Online MGTOW rhetoric is characterized by anti-feminism and misogyny, along with masculism and a desire to return to patriarchal male dominance. MGTOW believe that feminism has made women dangerous to men, and that male self-preservation requires dissociating completely from women. Common among the reasons given for avoiding relationships with women are the belief that women are favored in divorce settlements, despite data showing that women tend to be less financially stable than men after divorce. MGTOW also claim that women routinely falsely accuse men of rape and sexual misconduct, despite rape being generally underreported, and the actual prevalence of false rape accusations being very low.

A 2020 study by Wright et al. found that despite MGTOW claiming to reject women entirely, some 59% of MGTOW forum posts mentioned women, with the majority (61%) of those mentions being misogynistic in some way. Jones et al. suggest that this reflects a need for MGTOW to perform their rejection of women in order to belong.

The MGTOW community uses jargon shared by the broader manosphere, including the red pill and blue pill metaphor borrowed from the film The Matrix. Those in the manosphere who have been awakened from feminist "delusion" to the supposed reality that society is fundamentally misandrist and dominated by feminist values are said to be "redpilled" or have "taken the red pill"; those who do not accept that ideology are referred to as "bluepilled". Other jargon includes pejorative terms for other men such as "beta", "cuck", "soy boy", and "white knight".

Like other manosphere groups, MGTOW subscribe to the "red pill" belief that there is systemic bias against men in society, including double standards in gender roles and bias against men in family courts. MGTOW endorse the belief shared by other manosphere groups that women follow a similar pattern in dating and marriage: young and attractive women are promiscuous and engage in "hypergamy", having sex with numerous men and abandoning a man if a "higher-value" man shows interest. They believe women gravitate towards "alpha men" who are attractive but mistreat them, reinforcing the ideology of feminism. According to MGTOW, as women begin to age, they settle down with "beta males" who provide for them financially, but to whom they deny sex, sometimes engaging in extramarital sex with more attractive men; these relationships ultimately lead to divorce, in which the women will be favored by the courts due to what MGTOW call female privilege.

MGTOW men gauge their participation in the movement on a series of four levels. At the first level, men believe they are used and manipulated by women (called "situational awareness" or the "red pill") but still believe in the value of marriage; they are sometimes described as "purple pilled". At the second level, men reject long-term relationships, cohabitation, and marriage, but will still participate in shorter term relationships and sexual encounters. At the third level, men reject short-term relationships and limit their interactions with women. At the fourth level, men minimize their engagement with the state and society, including employment; this is called "going ghost". (Note: The MGTOW Wiki divides social and economic disengagement into separate levels.)

The Southern Poverty Law Center categorizes MGTOW as a part of the male supremacist ideology, a category they began tracking on their hate group tracking project, Hate Map, in 2018. Fellows at the Institute for Research on Male Supremacism publishing with the International Centre for Counter-Terrorism have said that members of MGTOW "openly disdain women, and normalize it through online harassment." MGTOW and other manosphere communities overlap with the reactionary, white nationalist alt-right and other white supremacist, authoritarian, and populist movements worldwide. Both MGTOW and the alt-right believe that feminism has destroyed Western society.

== Relation to other manosphere groups ==
The MGTOW community is a part of the manosphere, a varied collection of websites, blogs, and online forums promoting masculinity, hostility towards women, and opposition to feminism. The manosphere also includes men's rights activists, incels, pick-up artists, and the fathers' rights movement.

Although some consider MGTOW to be a part of the men's rights movement, others have cited MGTOW's separatist ideology as distinguishing them from the MRM, which engages in political activism to try to drive societal change. Some MGTOW also identify as incels ("involuntarily celibate"), while many view MGTOW and incels as completely separate groups. MGTOW members sometimes describe men's rights activists and incels as "losers" and "betas". Early MGTOW groups were primarily libertarian and opposed to "big government"; this led to a rift with men's rights activists who wished to lobby for governmental change, particularly with regards to custody and divorce law. Wright et al. state that the founders of MGTOW were originally men's rights activists who became disillusioned with political activism, believing the "gynocentric world order" could not be changed.

MGTOW is also at odds with the pick-up artist (PUA) community. Both PUA and MGTOW rhetoric is frequently misogynistic and objectifying towards women; however, whereas PUAs seek to manipulate women into providing sex, MGTOW claim to reject heterosexual relationships entirely. The two groups share a reciprocal disdain for one another; PUAs have mocked MGTOW as "Virgins Going Their Own Way", and MGTOW deride PUAs as being dependent on women's approval, contributing to what they see as overvaluing of women in society.

== See also ==
- 4B movement – Radical feminist movement
- Herbivore men – Japanese term for men with little interest in getting married or finding a girlfriend
- Meninism – Term used to describe the men's rights movement
- Shakers – Christian monastic denomination
- Sex segregation – Physical, legal, and cultural separation of people according to their gender or sex

== Works cited ==
- Basu, Tanya (7 February 2020). "The 'manosphere' is getting more toxic as angry men join the incels". MIT Technology Review.
- Chemaly, Soraya (2019). "Foreword" (PDF). In Ging, Debbie; Siapera, Eugenia (eds.). Gender Hate Online: Understanding the New Anti-Feminism. Cham: Palgrave Macmillan. doi:10.1007/978-3-319-96226-9. ISBN 978-3-319-96226-9. OCLC 1108619233.
- Dmitrieva, Aleksandra M.; Meloy, J. Reid (2022). "Troubled waters: Domestic terrorism threat in the U.S. coast guard and the TRAP-18". Journal of Threat Assessment and Management. 9 (3): 153–170. doi:10.1037/tam0000170. ISSN 2169-4850.
- Ging, Debbie (2019). "Alphas, Betas, and Incels: Theorizing the Masculinities of the Manosphere". Men and Masculinities. 22 (4): 638–657. doi:10.1177/1097184X17706401. ISSN 1097-184X. S2CID 149239953.
- Górska, Anna Maria; Kulicka, Karolina; Jemielniak, Dariusz (2023). "Men not going their own way: a thick big data analysis of #MGTOW and #Feminism tweets". Feminist Media Studies. 23 (8): 3774–3792. doi:10.1080/14680777.2022.2137829. ISSN 1468-0777.
- Hodapp, Christa (2017). Men's Rights, Gender, and Social Media. Lanham, Md.: Lexington Books. ISBN 978-1-49-852617-3.
- Horta Ribeiro, Manoel; Blackburn, Jeremy; Bradlyn, Barry; et al. (2021). "The Evolution of the Manosphere Across the Web". Proceedings of the International AAAI Conference on Web and Social Media. Vol. 15. Palo Alto, Calif.: Association for the Advancement of Artificial Intelligence. pp. 196–207. arXiv:2001.07600v5. doi:10.1609/icwsm.v15i1.18053. ISBN 978-1-57735-869-5. ISSN 2334-0770.
- Janik, Rachel (24 April 2018). ""I laugh at the death of normies": How incels are celebrating the Toronto mass killing". Hatewatch. Southern Poverty Law Center.
- Jasser, Greta; Kelly, Megan; Rothermel, Ann-Kathrin (20 May 2020). "Male supremacism and the Hanau terrorist attack: between online misogyny and far-right violence". International Centre for Counter-Terrorism Journal.
- Johanssen, Jacob (2023). "Incels, MGTOW and Heteropessimism". In McGlashan, Mark; Mercer, John (eds.). Toxic Masculinity: Men, Meaning, and Digital Media (1st ed.). London: Routledge. pp. 24–37. doi:10.4324/9781003263883. ISBN 978-1-003-26388-3.
- Jones, Callum; Trott, Verity; Wright, Scott (2020). "Sluts and soyboys: MGTOW and the production of misogynistic online harassment". New Media & Society. 22 (10): 1903–1921. doi:10.1177/1461444819887141. ISSN 1461-4448. S2CID 210530415.
- Kennedy-Kollar, Deniese (2024). "Men Going Their Own Way (MGTOW)". Extremism and Radicalization in the Manosphere: Beta Uprising. Routledge Studies in Crime and Society. New York: Routledge. pp. 58–64. doi:10.4324/9781032631080-6. ISBN 978-1-040-03920-5.
- Lin, Jie Liang (2017). "Antifeminism Online: MGTOW (Men Going Their Own Way)". In Frömming, Urte Undine; Köhn, Steffen; Fox, Samantha; Terry, Mike (eds.). Digital Environments: Ethnographic Perspectives Across Global Online and Offline Spaces. Edition Medienwissenschaft. Transcript Verlag. pp. 77–96. ISBN 978-3-8376-3497-6. JSTOR j.ctv1xxrxw.9.
- Lumsden, Karen (2019). "'I Want to Kill You in Front of Your Children' Is Not a Threat. It's an Expression of a Desire': Discourses of Online Abuse, Trolling, and Violence on r/MensRights". In Lumsden, Karen; Harmer, Emily (eds.). Online Othering: Exploring Digital Violence and Discrimination on the Web. Cham: Palgrave Macmillan. pp. 91–115. doi:10.1007/978-3-030-12633-9_4. ISBN 978-3-03-012632-2.
- "Male Supremacy". Southern Poverty Law Center. n.d. Archived from the original on 24 July 2025.
- Marwick, Alice; Lewis, Rebecca (15 May 2017). "Media Manipulation and Disinformation Online" (report). New York: Data & Society Research Institute.
- "Men at War". Reggie Yates' Extreme UK. Season 1. Episode 2. 12 January 2016. 22 minutes in. BBC Three.
- Nagle, Angela (2017). Kill All Normies: Online Culture Wars From 4Chan And Tumblr To Trump And The Alt-Right. Winchester, UK: Zero Books. ISBN 978-1-78535-543-1.
- O'Donnell, Jessica (2022). "Men's Rights Activism and the Manosphere". Gamergate and Anti-Feminism in the Digital Age. Cham: Palgrave Macmillan. pp. 9–61. doi:10.1007/978-3-031-14057-0_2. ISBN 978-3-031-14057-0.
- Schmitz, Rachel M.; Kazyak, Emily (2016). Robinson, Christine M.; Spivey, Sue (eds.). "Masculinities in Cyberspace: An Analysis of Portrayals of Manhood in Men's Rights Activist Websites". Social Sciences. 5 (2): 18. doi:10.3390/socsci5020018. ISSN 2076-0760.
- Thalen, Mikael (3 August 2021). "Reddit bans notorious anti-feminist subreddit 'Men Going Their Own Way'". The Daily Dot.
- Winter, Aaron (2019). "Online Hate: From the Far-Right to the 'Alt-Right' and from the Margins to the Mainstream". In Lumsden, Karen; Harmer, Emily (eds.). Online Othering: Exploring Digital Violence and Discrimination on the Web. Cham: Palgrave Macmillan. pp. 39–64. doi:10.1007/978-3-030-12633-9_2. ISBN 978-3-03-012632-2.
- Wright, Scott; Trott, Verity; Jones, Callum (2020). "'The pussy ain't worth it, bro': assessing the discourse and structure of MGTOW". Information, Communication & Society. 23 (6): 908–925. doi:10.1080/1369118X.2020.1751867. ISSN 1369-118X. S2CID 219023052.
- Zuckerberg, Donna (2018). Not All Dead White Men: Classics and Misogyny in the Digital Age. Cambridge, Mass.: Harvard University Press. ISBN 978-0-6749-7555-2. JSTOR j.ctv24w63tr. OCLC 1020311558.
