= Clarke–Glover Farmhouse =

Historic house in Massachusetts, United States

- U.S. National Register of Historic Places
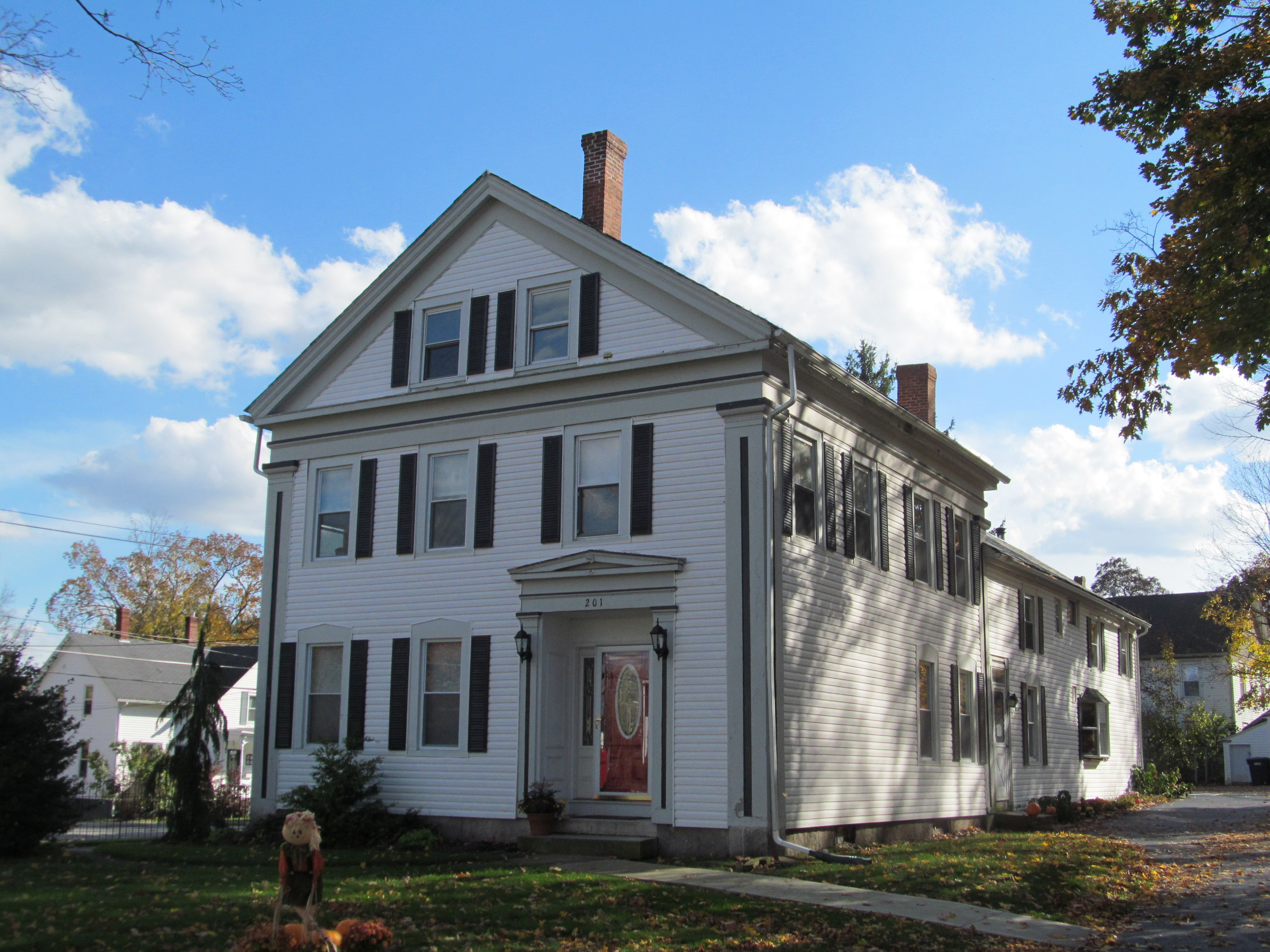
- 201 South Street

- Location within Massachusetts Location within the United States
- Location: 201 South St., Southbridge, Massachusetts
- Coordinates: 42°4′34″N 72°2′45″W
- Area: less than one acre
- Built: c. 1830
- Architectural style: Greek Revival
- MPS: Southbridge MRA
- NRHP reference No.: 89000536
- Added to NRHP: June 22, 1989

The Clarke–Glover Farmhouse is a historic house at 201 South Street in Southbridge, Massachusetts. Built about 1830, it is a good local example of Greek Revival architecture. It was listed on the National Register of Historic Places in 1989.

== Description and history ==
The Clarke–Glover Farmhouse is located in a predominantly residential area west of downtown Southbridge, at the southwest corner of South and High Street, on a large level lot fringed by iron fencing. It is a 2 1/2-story wood-frame structure, with a front-facing gabled roof and clapboarded exterior. The building corners have paneled pilasters rising to a full entablature and fully pedimented gable. The main facade is three bays wide, with the main entrance in the right bay. It is recessed in a paneled opening, which is framed by pilasters and topped by a peaked gable. Within the recess, the door, a modern replacement, is flanked by sidelight windows. A two-story ell extends to the rear.

The area where the Clarke-Glover house was built was primarily farmland until the early 19th century, when South Street began to be lined by houses of established and well-to-do families on spacious lots. This house was built c. 1830 by Lemuel Clarke, on land that once belonged to his father, Moses Clarke. When originally built it probably had Federal styling, but this was modified sometime thereafter during the Greek Revival, which is its present style. After Clarke died in 1845 the house was acquired by R. Glover, who is thought to have done the remodeling. Glover owned the house through much of the second half of the 19th century.

== See also ==
- National Register of Historic Places listings in Southbridge, Massachusetts
- National Register of Historic Places listings in Worcester County, Massachusetts
