= Meninism =

Term used to describe the men's rights movement

Meninism or menism is the belief system of various groups, including the men's rights movement, Incorporating men's rights and equal rights for men and women.

== History ==
The term meninism was used in the early 2000s to describe a male who opposed sexism and supported women's right for equality in society, politics and at work. By the next decade, the term was used on social media to make jokes which mocked and criticised radical feminism. In 2013, the BBC reported that the hashtag #MeninistTwitter was being used on Twitter, first to share jokes about feminism, but later to share more serious difficulties facing modern men.

== Meaning ==
Menism involves advocating for men’s rights. The term now sometimes refers to a movement promoting awareness of the issues affecting men, opposition to the oppression men face in the 21st century, opposition to feminism, and modern dating. Women can sometimes also identify as meninists.

According to Martin Daubney of The Telegraph, some meninists have used the term to discuss serious issues affecting men, such as domestic violence against men; fathers' rights and divorce issues; and disproportionate male prison sentences, suicide rates, and rates of homelessness. According to Radhika Sanghani of The Telegraph, the hashtag is most commonly used on Twitter to mock feminism, but has also been used as a way to draw attention to men's issues, similar to "The Red Pill" forum on Reddit. Sanghani says that the movement's reaction to feminism is based more on the label than feminism's views. Abigail James writing for Catholic Online said that while meninism raises legitimate issues which should be taken seriously, its heart is based on a misinterpretation of the meaning of feminism. Antifeminism is also associated with the Meninist movement.

== Usage ==
Mintified, an India-based right-wing media website, started the #BlameOneNotAll hashtag to discourage generalisations of men. According to Victoria Richards of The Independent, the campaign was part of the meninist movement. The campaign received backlash for shifting focus away from the victims of rape and implying that basic decency should be rewarded. In an opinion piece for The Economic Times Shephali Bhatt criticised the use of the movement and International Men's Day to sell deodorant, saying "...for an initiative to become a social phenomena, it needs to be rooted in truth. And the truth is that [men are] a sufficiently privileged gender, comparatively."

The hashtags have also been used for T-shirts and similar, with self-portraits of people wearing the clothes widely shared on social media. Several outlets reported that the clothes and images were widely mocked, and often Photoshopped sarcastically.

The term is used in India to perpetuate the traditionalist subjugation of women. A section of Indian male YouTubers have used meninist rhetoric to promote harassment of women and to justify violence against them.

James Millar used the phrase in the New Statesman stating that for meninists "fighting, cat-calling and barbecuing is basically all [they’ve] got".
