= Samuel Warren Dike =

American clergyman and activist (1839–1913)

Samuel Warren Dike (1839–1913) was an American Congregational clergyman, born in Thompson, Connecticut. He graduated at Williams College in 1863 and at Andover Theological Seminary in 1866. Intent on reforming the laws of divorce, he organized the Divorce Reform League (National League for the Protection of the Family) in 1881.
