= Hamilton House =

Hamilton House most often refers to:

- Hamilton House (Providence, Rhode Island), a non-profit organization

Hamilton House may also refer to:

== Places ==
=== Scotland ===
- Hamilton House, East Lothian, a manor in East Lothian

=== United States ===
==== California ====
- Thomas Hamilton House (San Diego, California), a San Diego historic landmark
- Capt. James A. Hamilton House, San Jose

==== Georgia ====
- Dr. James S. Hamilton House, Athens, listed on the NRHP in Clarke County, Georgia

==== Illinois ====
- John M. Hamilton House, Bloomington
- Robert W. Hamilton House, Murphysboro

==== Indiana ====
- John Hamilton House, Shelbyville

==== Kentucky ====
- Hance Hamilton House, Boston, listed on the NRHP in Hardin County, Kentucky
- Hamilton House (Lancaster, Kentucky), listed on the NRHP in Garrard County, Kentucky
- Roscoe Hamilton House, Lancaster
- Thomas H. Hamilton House, Springfield, listed on the NRHP in Washington County, Kentucky
- Hamilton Farm, Springfield, listed on the NRHP in Washington County, Kentucky

==== Maine ====
- Thomas Hamilton House (Calais, Maine)
- Hamilton House (South Berwick, Maine) or the Jonathan Hamilton House, and a National Historic Landmark, in York County

==== Maryland ====
- Hamilton House, in Bethesda, now the Stone Ridge School of the Sacred Heart
- James Hamilton House, Mitchellville

==== Massachusetts ====
- Hamilton Mill Brick House, Southbridge

==== Michigan ====
- George Hamilton House, Stambaugh, listed on the NRHP in Iron County

==== Missouri ====
- Hamilton House (Bethany, Missouri)

==== Nebraska ====
- William Hamilton House, Bellevue
- Hamilton-Donald House, Grand Island

==== New Jersey ====
- Hamilton House (Clifton, New Jersey)

==== New York ====
- Hamilton Farmstead, Mexico, New York
- Hamilton Park Community Houses

==== Ohio ====
- Hamilton-Ickes House, Adena, listed on the NRHP in Jefferson County, Ohio
- J.L. Hamilton Residence, Amlin, listed on the NRHP in Franklin County, Ohio
- Gilbert H. Hamilton House, Columbus

==== Oregon ====
- Benjamin Hamilton House, Bend, listed on the NRHP in Deschutes County, Oregon
- Alexander B. and Anna Balch Hamilton House, Portland
- Judge James Watson Hamilton House, Roseburg

==== Pennsylvania ====
- Hamilton Family Estate, Philadelphia
- Alexander Hamilton House, Waynesboro
- Hamilton-Ely Farmstead, Whitely Township

==== Tennessee ====
- Hamilton-Brown House, Franklin

==== Texas ====
- Joseph Andrew Hamilton House, Wharton, listed on the NRHP in Wharton County, Texas
- William Benjamin Hamilton House, Wichita Falls, listed on the NRHP in Wichita County, Texas

==== Vermont ====
- John Hamilton Farmstead, Bridport

==== West Virginia ====
- Hamilton Round Barn, Mannington
- Martin Hamilton House, Summersville

==== Wisconsin ====
- Hamilton-Brooks Site, Berlin, listed on the NRHP in Green Lake County, Wisconsin

== See also ==
- Thomas Hamilton House (disambiguation)
- Hamilton Hall (disambiguation)
- Hamilton Palace, grand house in South Lanarkshire, Scotland
