= Thomas Hamilton House =

Thomas Hamilton House may refer to:

- Thomas Hamilton House (San Diego, California), a San Diego historic landmark
- Thomas Hamilton House (Calais, Maine), listed on the NRHP in Washington County, Maine

== See also ==
- Hamilton House (disambiguation)
