= Hamilton Mill Brick House =

Historic house in Massachusetts, United States

- U.S. National Register of Historic Places
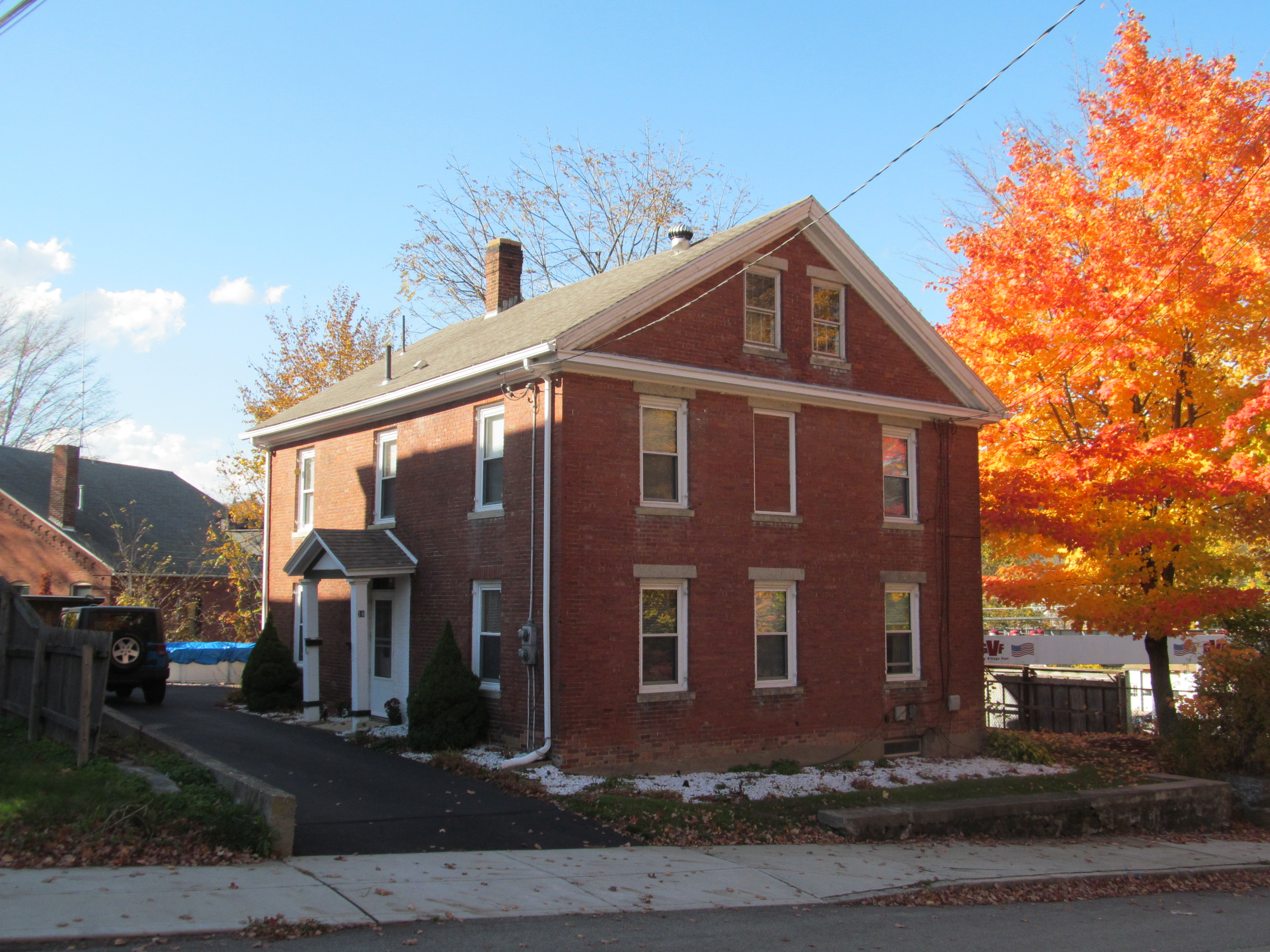
- view of the rear and east side

- Location within Massachusetts Location within the United States
- Location: 16 High Street, Southbridge, Massachusetts
- Coordinates: 42°4′48″N 72°2′43″W
- Built: 1855
- Architectural style: Greek Revival
- MPS: Southbridge MRA
- NRHP reference No.: 89000542
- Added to NRHP: June 22, 1989

The Hamilton Mill Brick House is a historic house at 16 High Street in Southbridge, Massachusetts. Built c. 1855 by the Hamilton Woolen Mill Company, it is one of a small number of brick company housing units to survive from that time. The house was listed on the National Register of Historic Places on June 22, 1989.

== Description and history ==
The Hamilton Mill Brick House on the west side of High Street, just south of Main Street and west of High Street's junction with Ash Street. Facing south, the house is a 2 1/2-story brick structure, five bays wide, with a side gable roof and single off-center brick chimney. It has a granite sills and lintels, and a recessed front door with sidelight and transom windows. A secondary entrance on the north side, which is three bays wide, is sheltered by a gabled porch. The side gables are fully pedimented, with two sash windows in the gable.

Although brick was not a house building material commonly used in Southbridge when this house was built c. 1855, most of the worker housing built by the Hamilton Woolen Mill Company was. This is one of a few surviving brick houses of the period in Southbridge (the other, the Vinton-Torrey House, is also listed, but is a farmhouse outside the downtown and industrial area). Many other instances of the company's housing in the High and Sayles Street have since been demolished, but this one and the Hamilton Millwright-Agent's House survive. This house was still in company ownership at the turn of the 20th century, and was probably used to house senior company management.

== See also ==
- National Register of Historic Places listings in Southbridge, Massachusetts
- National Register of Historic Places listings in Worcester County, Massachusetts
