= Martin Hamilton (disambiguation) =

Martin Hamilton may refer to:

- Martin D. Hamilton (American politician)
- Martin Hamilton-Smith (Australian politician)
- Martin Hamilton House (Historic house in West Virginia, United States)
