= Hamilton Hall =

Hamilton Hall can refer to several buildings including:

- Hamilton Hall (Columbia University)
- Hamilton Hall (McMaster University)
- Hamilton Hall (Montana State University) named after James M. Hamilton.
- Hamilton Hall (Salem, Massachusetts)
- Hamilton Hall (University of St Andrews). The previous name of the Hamilton Grand

== See also ==
- Hamilton House (disambiguation)
- Hamilton Palace, grand house in South Lanarkshire, Scotland
