= New Brighton, Staten Island =

Neighborhood in New York City

New Brighton
- Neighborhood of Staten Island
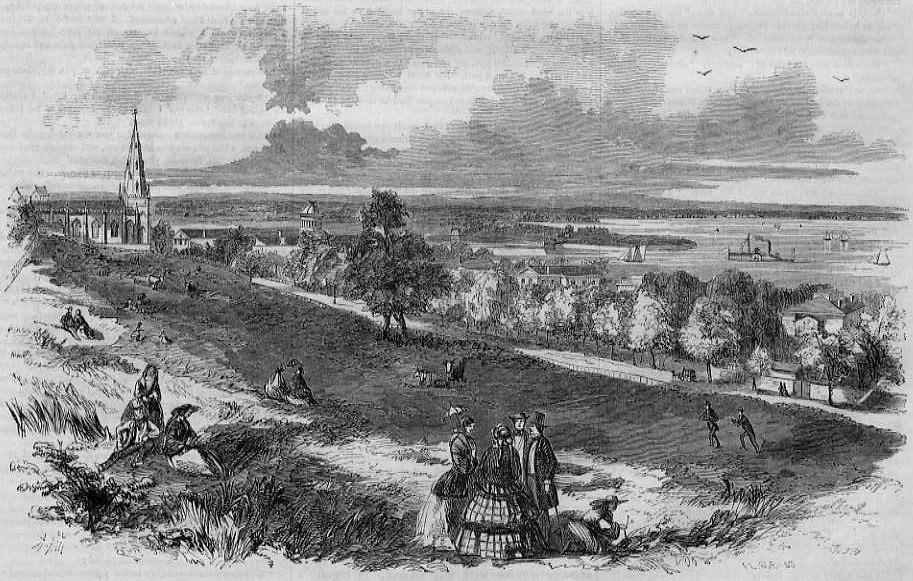
- View of Brighton, Staten Island, New York, an 1857 engraving
- Location in New York City
- Coordinates: 40.643°N 74.093°W
- Country: United States
- State: New York
- City: New York City
- Borough: Staten Island
- Community District: Staten Island 1

Area
  - Total: 0.361 sq mi (0.93 km^{2})

Population (2020)
  - Total: 20,549
  - Density: 56,900/sq mi (22,000/km^{2})

Economics
  - Median income: $49,807
- ZIP Codes: 10301
- Area code: 718, 347, 929, and 917

New Brighton is a neighborhood located on the North Shore of Staten Island in New York City. The neighborhood comprises an older industrial and residential harbor front area along the Kill Van Kull west of St. George. New Brighton is bounded by Kill Van Kull on the north, Jersey Street on the east, Brighton and Castleton Avenues to the south, and Lafayette Avenue and Snug Harbor Cultural Center to the west. It is adjacent to St. George to the east, Tompkinsville to the south, and West New Brighton to the west.

The village of New Brighton was incorporated in 1866 as part of the town of Castleton and was divided into six wards. It originally stretched four miles (6.4 km) long and was two miles (3.2 km) wide, encompassing the entire northeast tip of the island from Tompkinsville to Snug Harbor, and included what is now St. George. The current neighborhood includes Hamilton Park, an enclave of Victorian-era homes developed before and during the American Civil War. The surrounding area includes several older churches, including St. Peter's Church, the first Roman Catholic parish established on Staten Island. The original New Brighton Village Hall, constructed in 1871 on present Fillmore Street, was ordered demolished in December 2003 and was demolished in February 2004. New Brighton public housing includes the Cassidy-Laffayette Houses and the Richmond Terrace Houses on Jersey Street.

New Brighton is part of Staten Island Community District 1 and its ZIP Codes are 10304 and 10301. New Brighton is patrolled by the 120th Precinct of the New York City Police Department.

== History ==
=== Precolonial and colonial period ===
Originally, Staten Island was inhabited by the Munsee-speaking Lenape Native Americans. The Lenape relocated during different seasons, moving toward the shore to fish during the summers, and moving inland to hunt and grow crops during the fall and winter. The present-day area of New York City was inhabited in 1624 by Dutch settlers as part of New Netherland. In 1664, the Dutch gave New Netherland to the British, and six years later the British finalized a purchase agreement with the Lenape.

At the time of British handover, several British, Dutch, and French settlers occupied the area, but did not have an established title to the land. A series of surveys were conducted through 1677, and several parcels were distributed to different landowners. Among them were the 340-acre (140 ha) "Duxbury Glebe", given to Ellis Duxbury in 1708, bequeathed to the Protestant Episcopal Church of St. Andrew's ten years later, and then leased for 54 years by John Bard in 1765. Another tract was granted to Lambert Jansen Dorlant in 1680, whose western boundary was a brook on present-day Jersey Street. By 1748 it had been purchased by Salmon Comes, who ran a ferry to Manhattan. By 1765, part of the Dorlant tract was owned by John Wandel, a molasses distiller who operated a plant at the Kill Van Kull near Richmond Terrace and Westervelt Avenue, taking advantage of the Jersey Street brook. Two Native American roads intersected near the distiller: Shore Road (today's Richmond Terrace) on the North Shore, and a road that winded southward on St. Marks Place and then Hamilton and Westervelt Avenues.

Fort Hill, one of the hills overlooking the harbor, was the location on Duxbury's Point or Ducksberry Point, fortified by the British during the American Revolutionary War. Hessian troops, contracted by the British, were stationed near the Jersey Street brook, which then became known as Hessian Springs. After the end of the war, the area remained primarily rural through the early 19th century. The area became part of the town of Castleton upon the town's incorporation in 1788.

=== 19th century ===
==== Early ownership ====
Among the first people to promote the widespread development of Staten Island was former U.S. vice president Daniel D. Tompkins, who purchased land in the northern part of Staten Island in the early 1810s. Tompkins purchased Abraham Crocheron's farm, located on present-day Jersey Street south of Richmond Terrace, in 1814. The next year, he acquired 700 acres (280 ha) from St. Andrew's Church, and two years after that, he bought Philip Van Buskirk's land claim, located between the two disconnected pieces of land. Tompkins also incorporated the Richmond Turnpike Company to build present-day Victory Boulevard in 1816, started operating a ferry to Manhattan in 1817, and laid out the adjacent village of Tompkinsville for development between 1819 and 1821. Tompkins then expanded the Van Buskirks' old farmhouse, using it as his primary residence. He died in 1825.

Tompkins's property on the North Shore was sold in April 1834 to Manhattan developer Thomas E. Davis, who continued to buy land through the following year. Davis came to own all the land on Staten Island's northeastern shore, bounded to the south by Victory Boulevard, to the west by Sailors' Snug Harbor, and to the north and east by the waterfront. He planned to develop the area into a summer retreat called New Brighton, renaming Shore Road to Richmond Terrace, and the first five Greek Revival summer bungalows were erected in 1835. Davis sold the development to a five-person syndicate for $600,000 in 1836, and the New Brighton Association was incorporated that April. The area on the northeast shore thus came to be called New Brighton.

==== Increasing development ====
Development on the New Brighton street grid proceeded according to a plan that surveyor James Lyons had created in 1835. Streets were arranged around existing topography. When the New Brighton Association laid out streets in northeastern Staten Island, many of these roads were named after notable politicians, with such names as Hamilton Avenue, Jay Street, and Madison Street. Other streets were named after people or places that were associated with the development of the area, including Tompkins, Davis, or the Stuyvesant family (who were early investors). For instance, St. Marks Place was named after Davis's developments on St. Marks Place in Manhattan, while Westervelt Avenue was named after Tompkins's son-in-law. Several of these street names replaced preexisting appellations.

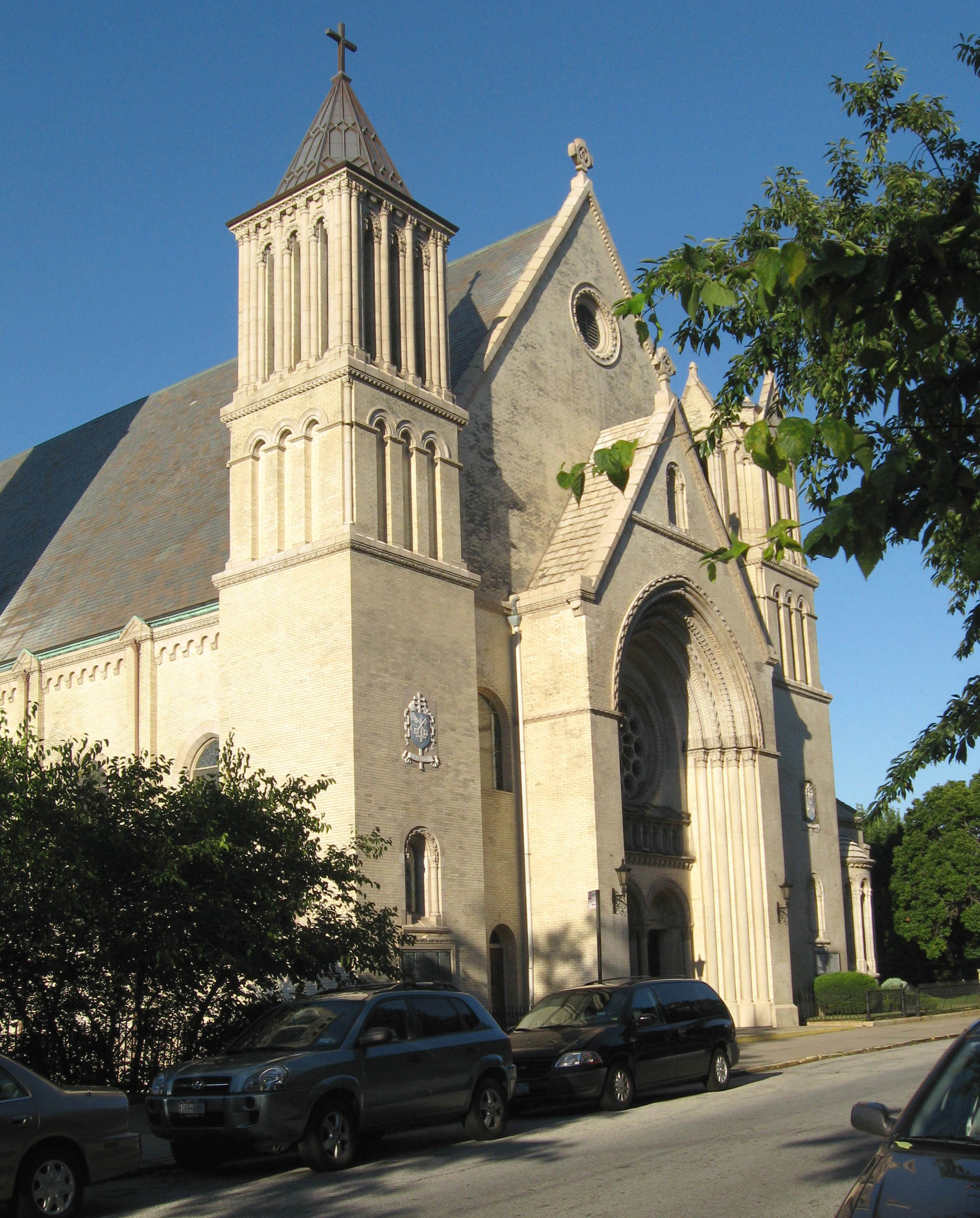
St. Peter's Church

Work on the street grid and development of the land continued, but in March 1837, one major investor declared bankruptcy following the Panic of 1837. The same year, the Pavilion Hotel opened in a mansion along the shore, being converted from a residence. The association continued to lay out streets. However, in 1840, four of the five original New Brighton Association investors' properties were foreclosed upon. The foreclosed lots were thus repurchased by Thomas E. Davis in 1844. According to a survey conducted the following year, several streets had been laid out in New Brighton, including Carroll Place, Hamilton Avenue, St. Marks Place, Richmond Terrace, and numerous smaller streets. Most development was on the waterfront, where there were mansions with carriage buildings, as well as smaller homes and the Pavilion Hotel. St. Peter's Church on Carroll Street, dedicated in 1844, was the island's first Roman Catholic house of worship; it remains one of Staten Island's most historically important churches, with more than half of the island's Catholic churches having been derived from St. Peter's parish. Two Greek Revival houses remain on the waterfront, at 404 and 272 Richmond Terrace.

By the 1840s and 1850s, New Brighton including modern-day St. George began to develop into a summer resort area. In addition to the existing Pavilion, hotels in modern-day St. George/New Brighton included the Peteler (later St. Marks) Hotel, as well as the Belmont Hotel. Additionally, new houses such as Italianate villas were built, while existing Richmond Terrace mansions were expanded or received new annexes and gardens. Several greenhouses were also built in the neighborhood, particularly on the land of the merchant John C. Green, whose estate is now the site of Curtis High School. The silk printer John Crabtree established a printing plant for his company, Crabtree and Wilkinson, on the eastern bank of the Jersey Street brook in 1844. The factory had over 180 workers and a small residential and commercial community by 1853, and the establishment of similar factories led to the population of New Brighton doubling between 1840 and 1860.

In 1861, the onset of the American Civil War resulted in large changes to the neighborhood's land use. Initially, the local economy suffered due to cessation of trade with the Southern United States, but because of the Union Army's demand for material, many entrepreneurs and workers moved to New York City, including to Staten Island's North Shore. According to a 1865 article from the Richmond County Gazette, "the demand for dwelling houses upon the island has never before been equalled." During this time, many new houses were designed in the Second Empire style and/or as duplexes, particularly on as-yet-undeveloped plots along Westervelt Avenue or St. Marks Place. The end of the Civil War, cheaper building materials, and technological improvements resulted in an increase in real estate prices on the North Shore, and by the early 1870s, the area was described as being prosperous, with real estate in high demand.

==== Late 19th century ====
The New Brighton Village Hall was built in 1871 and was one of the few Village Halls to remain from the old village system that existed before it was merged with New York City. A passage from an anonymous author in the Illustrated Sketch Book of Staten Island, NY: Its industries and commerce, from 1886, describes New Brighton as follows:

The village of New Brighton is unique in its attractiveness. Its public buildings, churches, hotels and institutions are all handsome and substantial, its residences the perfection of refined taste; it has fifteen miles (24 km) of streets, the principal of which are wide, well paved, and generally well shaded with ornamental trees. A complete system of sewerage has been adopted. The inhabitants are filled with a sense of local pride which is in itself most commendable and leads to the happiest results, the most noticeable of which perhaps is the great care bestowed upon their private residences. The neighbors seem to vie with each other in friendly emulation as to who shall keep the smoothest lawn, the neatest fence or the most graceful fountain. As a whole, the effect is most pleasing, but when the eye wanders beyond the artificial beauty of its immediate surroundings and rests upon the sparkling waters of the incomparable Bay of New York, with stretches of cultivated landscape in the distance, the picture is singularly lovely and complete.

The Panic of 1873 resulted in a near-cessation of building activity on the North Shore. By the late 1870s, industries had started to move to the area again, such as J. B. King and Company, whose plaster mill opened in 1877. A water system was established upon the Staten Island Water Supply Company's 1879 incorporation, and a sewage system was added between 1884 and 1890. In the 1880s, the area closest to the ferry terminals on the northeastern shore became known as "St. George", after developer George Law, who acquired rights to the New Brighton waterfront at bargain prices. According to island historians Charles Leng and William T. Davis, the businessman Erastus Wiman, who was expanding the Staten Island Railway to New Brighton, promised to "canonize" Law if the latter agreed to relinquish the land rights for a new railroad–ferry terminal there. The St. George Terminal opened in early 1886, bringing more development to the neighborhood.

The completion of new transportation options also resulted in further real estate development, especially around the areas close to New Brighton and St. George stations. Developers such as John M. Pendleton and Anson Phelps Stokes constructed cottages and houses in the northern part of St. George, while existing property owners expanded their properties. Many newer houses, meanwhile, were designed in the Queen Anne, Shingle, and Colonial Revival styles. Although Staten Island as a whole remained largely residential and less densely populated and developed than the surrounding region, the inhabitants of the region favored consolidation with the greater metropolis. In 1898, Staten Island was consolidated with New York City, and this move accelerated development of the region. At this time immigrant groups settled in New Brighton in greater numbers; Italians and African-Americans along the Kill Van Kull, and Jewish communities on the eastern boundary of the village near St. George and Tompkinsville.

=== 20th century ===
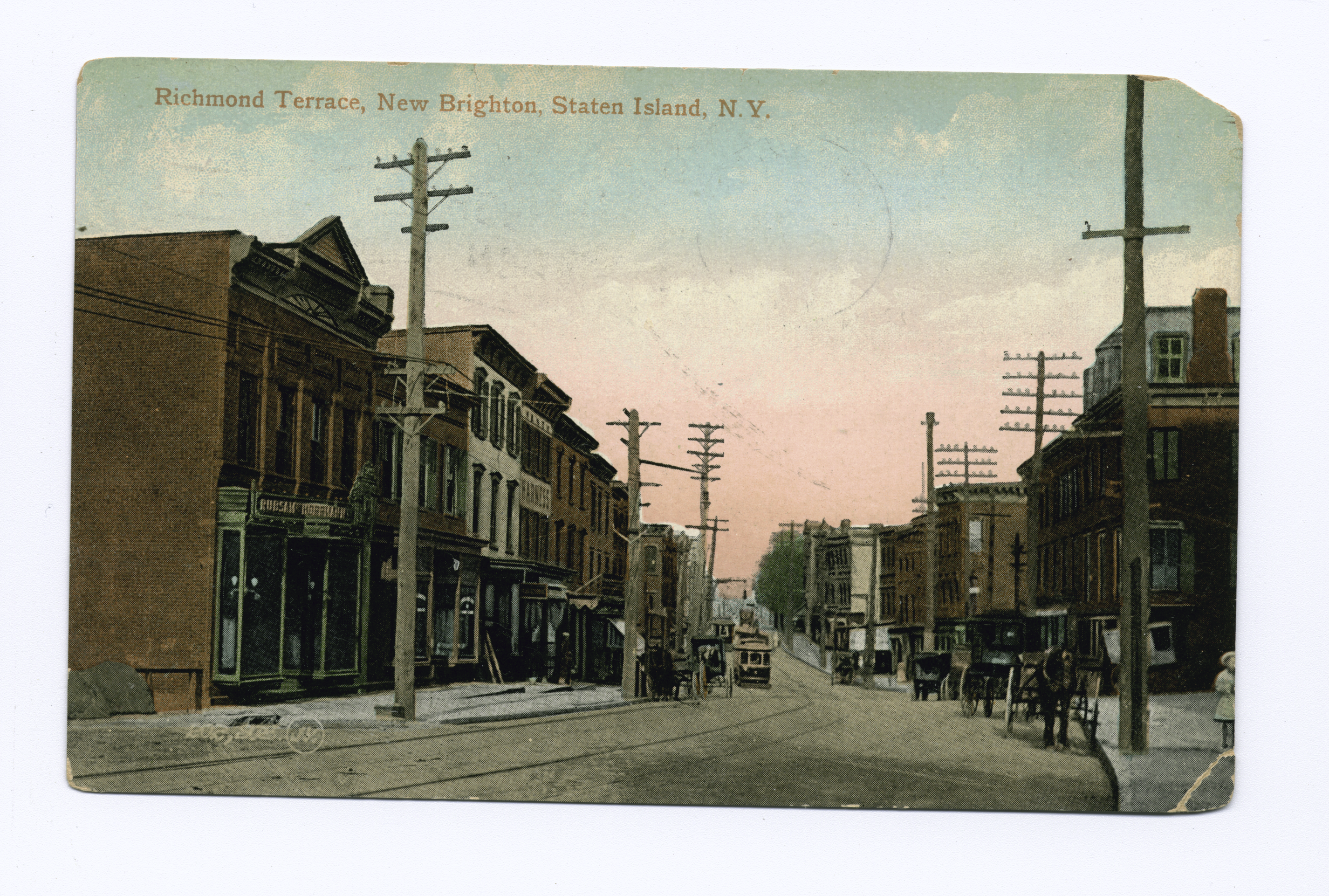
Richmond Terrace, New Brighton, early 20th century

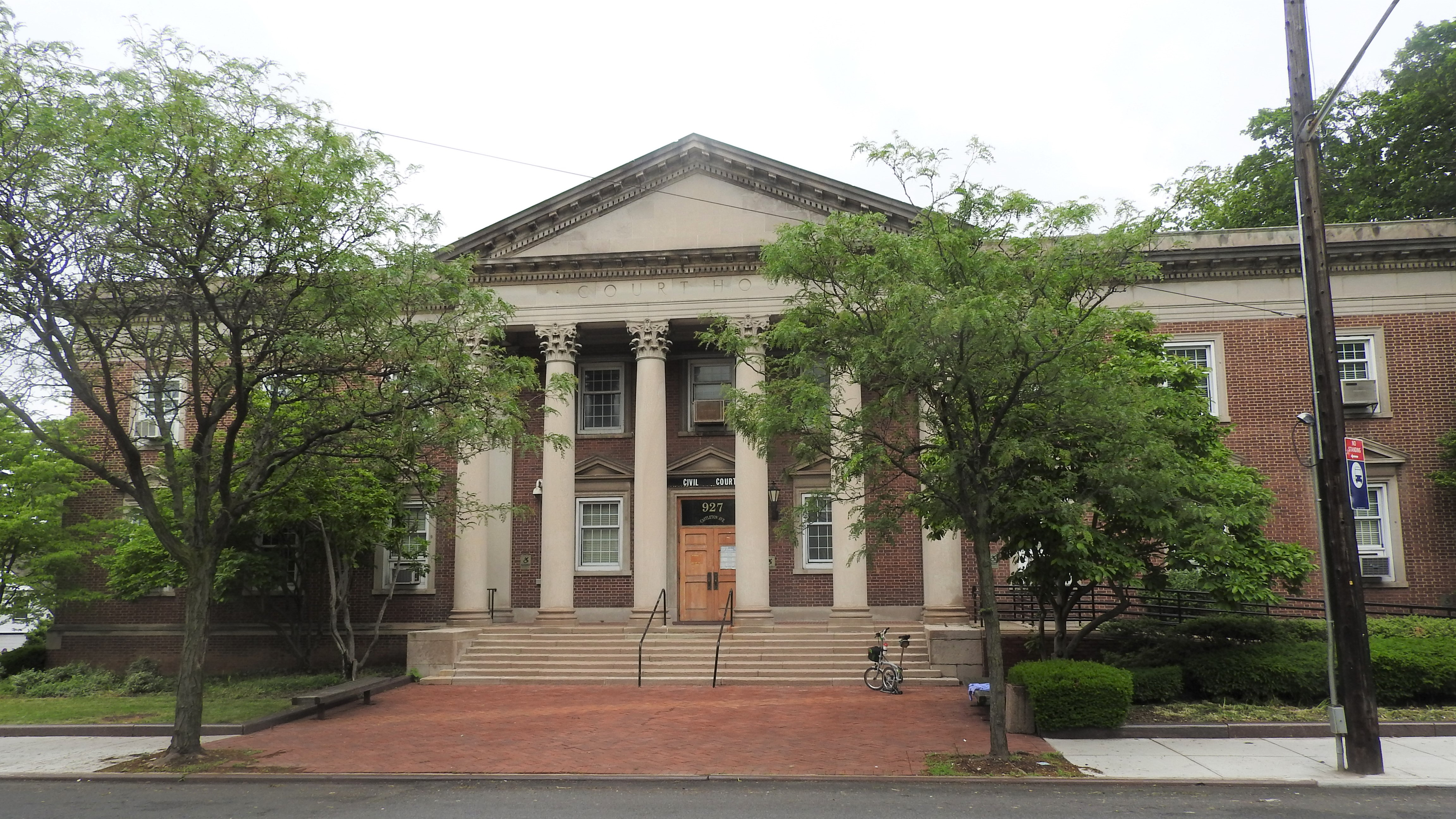
Civil Courthouse on Castleton Avenue

In the years after unification, the North Shore became quickly urbanized, and the political and economic center of Staten Island shifted to the region. The area's first secondary school, Curtis High School, opened in 1904. The ferry service to Whitehall Terminal was transferred to municipal operation the following year. Other city services were also brought to Staten Island following unification, such as schools, emergency facilities, new roads, and utilities including an underground water supply. Neighboring St. George became the civic center of Staten Island, with a new Staten Island Borough Hall built in 1906 and the Richmond County Courthouse in 1919. This provided the impetus for improvements in infrastructure, including road construction, police and fire protection, and two commuter airports on Staten Island that were established in the 20th century. Navy and Coast Guard outposts could be found on the north shore of Staten Island, each employing local residents in military and civilian capacities.

Staten Island and New Brighton thrived economically. Larger manufacturers employed many local residents; Procter & Gamble, US Gypsum, and several other factories provided jobs for thousands of residents. The Procter & Gamble factory, opened in October 1907, operated for more than 80 years. At the end of the 1920s, some of the borough's first apartment buildings and four-family dwellings were concentrated in New Brighton. One such apartment building collapsed in a storm in 1937, killing nineteen people.

The 1964 opening of the Verrazzano–Narrows Bridge, connecting Brooklyn and Staten Island, allowed for a massive population and development boom that continues to this day. This, combined with the closing of many area factories, the construction of housing projects along Richmond Terrace and the surrounding area, and an increase in area poverty, caused large changes to New Brighton.

== Demographics ==
For census purposes, the New York City Department of City Planning classifies New Brighton as part of a larger Neighborhood Tabulation Area called St. George-New Brighton SI0101. This designated neighborhood had 20,549 inhabitants based on data from the 2020 United States Census. This was an increase of 1,775 persons (9.5%) from the 18,774 counted in 2010. The neighborhood had a population density of 33.0 inhabitants per acre (14,500/sq mi; 5,600/km^{2}).

The racial makeup of the neighborhood was 21.4% (4,394) White (Non-Hispanic), 31.9% (6,561) Black (Non-Hispanic), 7.2% (1,471) Asian, and 5.3% (1,074) from two or more races. Hispanic or Latino of any race were 34.3% (7,049) of the population.

According to the 2020 United States Census, this area has many cultural communities of over 1,000 inhabitants. This include residents who identify as Mexican, Puerto Rican, Irish, Italian, and African-American.

The largest age group was people 25–39 years old, which made up 22% of the residents. 59.6% of the households had at least one family present. Out of the 7,732 households, 27.8% had a married couple (10.8% with a child under 18), 6.6% had a cohabiting couple (2.3% with a child under 18), 24.7% had a single male (2% with a child under 18), and 40.9% had a single female (11.3% with a child under 18). 31.1% of households had children under 18. In this neighborhood, 70.2% of non-vacant housing units are renter-occupied.

The entirety of Community District 1, which comprises New Brighton and other neighborhoods on the North Shore, had 181,484 inhabitants as of NYC Health's 2018 Community Health Profile, with an average life expectancy of 79.0 years. This is lower than the median life expectancy of 81.2 for all New York City neighborhoods. Most inhabitants are youth and middle-aged adults: 24% are between the ages of between 0–17, 27% between 25 and 44, and 26% between 45 and 64. The ratio of college-aged and elderly residents was lower, at 10% and 13% respectively.

As of 2017, the median household income in Community District 1 was $48,018, though the median income in New Brighton individually was $49,807. In 2018, an estimated 21% of New Brighton and the North Shore residents lived in poverty, compared to 17% in all of Staten Island and 20% in all of New York City. One in fourteen residents (7%) were unemployed, compared to 6% in Staten Island and 9% in New York City. Rent burden, or the percentage of residents who have difficulty paying their rent, is 51% in New Brighton and the North Shore, compared to the boroughwide and citywide rates of 49% and 51% respectively. Based on this calculation, as of 2018, New Brighton and the North Shore are considered high-income relative to the rest of the city and not gentrifying.

== Attractions ==
One Pendleton Place, the Christ Church New Brighton (Episcopal), Hamilton Park Community Houses, and Neville House are listed on the National Register of Historic Places.

=== Snug Harbor ===
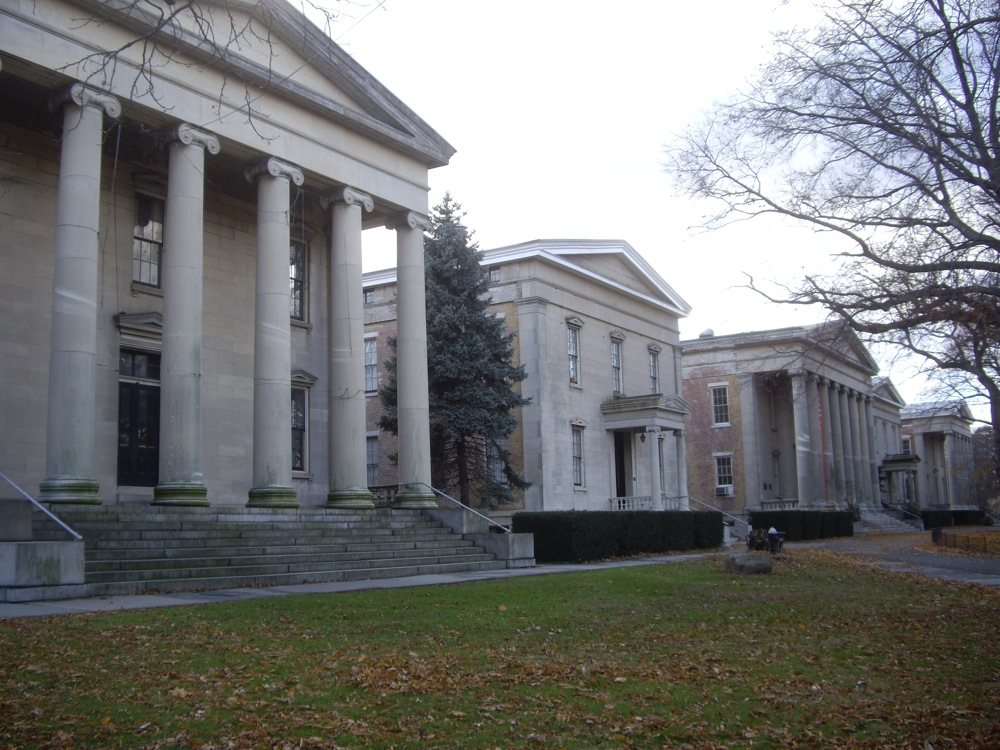
Sailors Snug Harbor

Sailors' Snug Harbor was built in 1833 by a wealthy New Yorker named Robert Richard Randall. Designed as a place for retired sailors, Snug Harbor was the first establishment of its kind in the United States. The 83-acre (340,000 m^{2}) park-like setting is located on the North Shore of Staten Island along the Kill Van Kull. Sailors' Snug Harbor includes 26 Greek Revival, Beaux Arts, Italianate and Victorian style buildings. At its peak, 1,000 sailors made their home at Snug Harbor, but due to a decline in funding caused by the founding of the Social Security program, the site closed in the 1960s.

The site is considered Staten Island's "crown jewel" and "an incomparable remnant of New York's 19th-century seafaring past." It is a National Historic Landmark District and is also designated by the New York City Landmarks Preservation Commission. The site is now called Snug Harbor Cultural Center and Botanical Gardens and has gardens, museums, theaters, educational spaces, and special events.

=== St. Peter's Church ===
The first weekly Mass of St. Peter's Roman Catholic Church was held in 1839 in a gun factory in New Brighton. The New Brighton Association later donated land for the church, which opened in 1844 near its current location on St. Mark's Place. After a fire destroyed the original church in the 1890s, George Edward Harding & Gooch designed a new church building that was completed in 1903. The interior of the church has influence from the French-Gothic style, visible in its vaulted ceilings that are curved and end in a point at the top. It be seen from almost anywhere in New Brighton, and one that stands out while approaching from the Staten Island Ferry.

=== W.S. Pendleton Houses ===
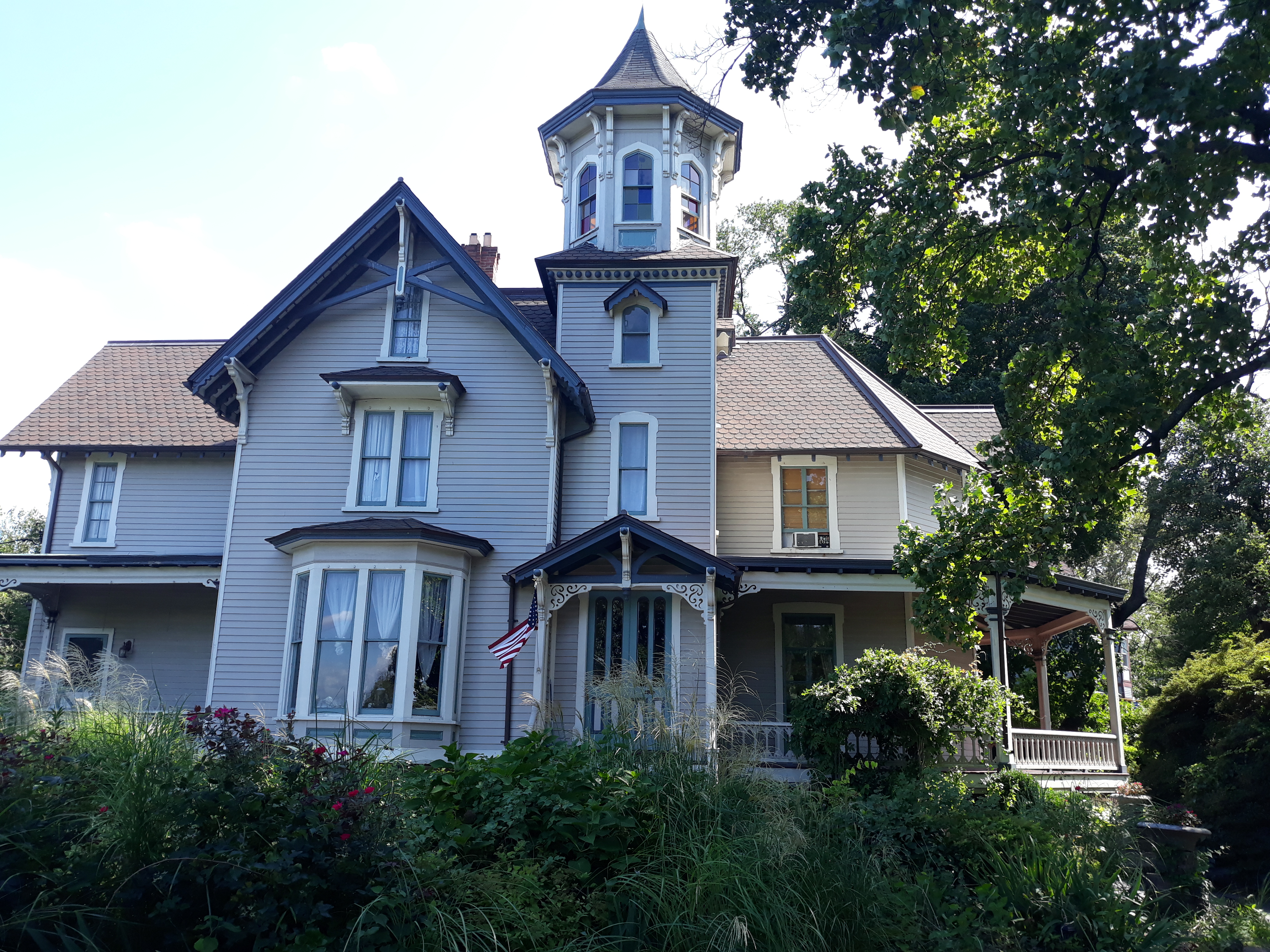
One Pendleton Place

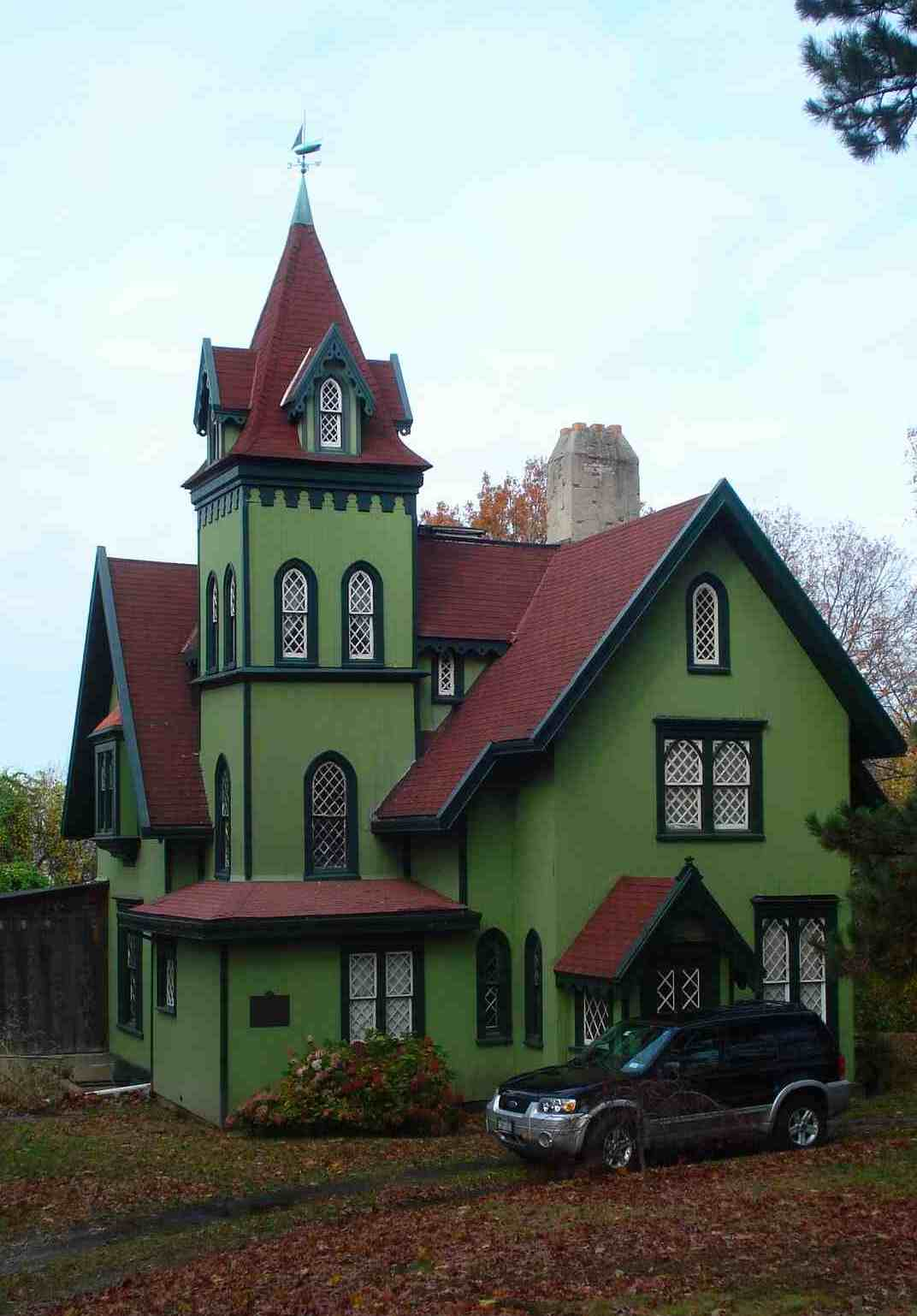
22 Pendleton Place

The W.S. Pendleton Houses at 1 & 22 Pendleton Place are designated landmarks of New York City, and 1 Pendleton Place was additionally listed on the National Register of Historic Places in 2014. Both houses were once owned by W.S. Pendleton, a prominent local businessman who worked in real estate and owned a local ferry boat company. Pendleton, born in New York City in 1795, later became a pioneer lithographer in Boston.

Built in 1861, 1 Pendleton Place was designed by Charles Duggin in the Stick style. 22 Pendleton Place, a Gothic Revival style house built in 1855, possesses a distinctive individuality, with its square, spire-topped tower, steeply pitched gables, pendant scrollwork, asymmetrically placed dormers, bay windows and oriel window.

=== Atlantic Salt Company ===
The Atlantic Salt Company is located along Richmond Terrace and stores salt that is used to remove ice from roads in New York, New Jersey, and Connecticut. Walking along Richmond Terrace, the many hills of white salt can be glimpsed along the side of the road. During the winter, over 350,000 tons of salt are stored at this New Brighton location. The Atlantic Salt Co. purchased its current location in 1976, a gypsum corporation plant owned and used the property. The Atlantic Salt Co. is family-run and operated by the Mahoney family; the first generation, headed by founder and former president Leo Mahoney, started the business in 1955.

=== September 11 Memorial ===
This large mural, painted by a local artist who paints under the name FWID, adorns the side of the warehouse on Richmond Terrace where Gerardi's Farmer Market is located. The three firefighters raising the American Flag in the center of the image strike a pose that is reminiscent of the historic photograph Raising the Flag on Iwo Jima by Joe Rosenthal.

=== Farmer's market ===
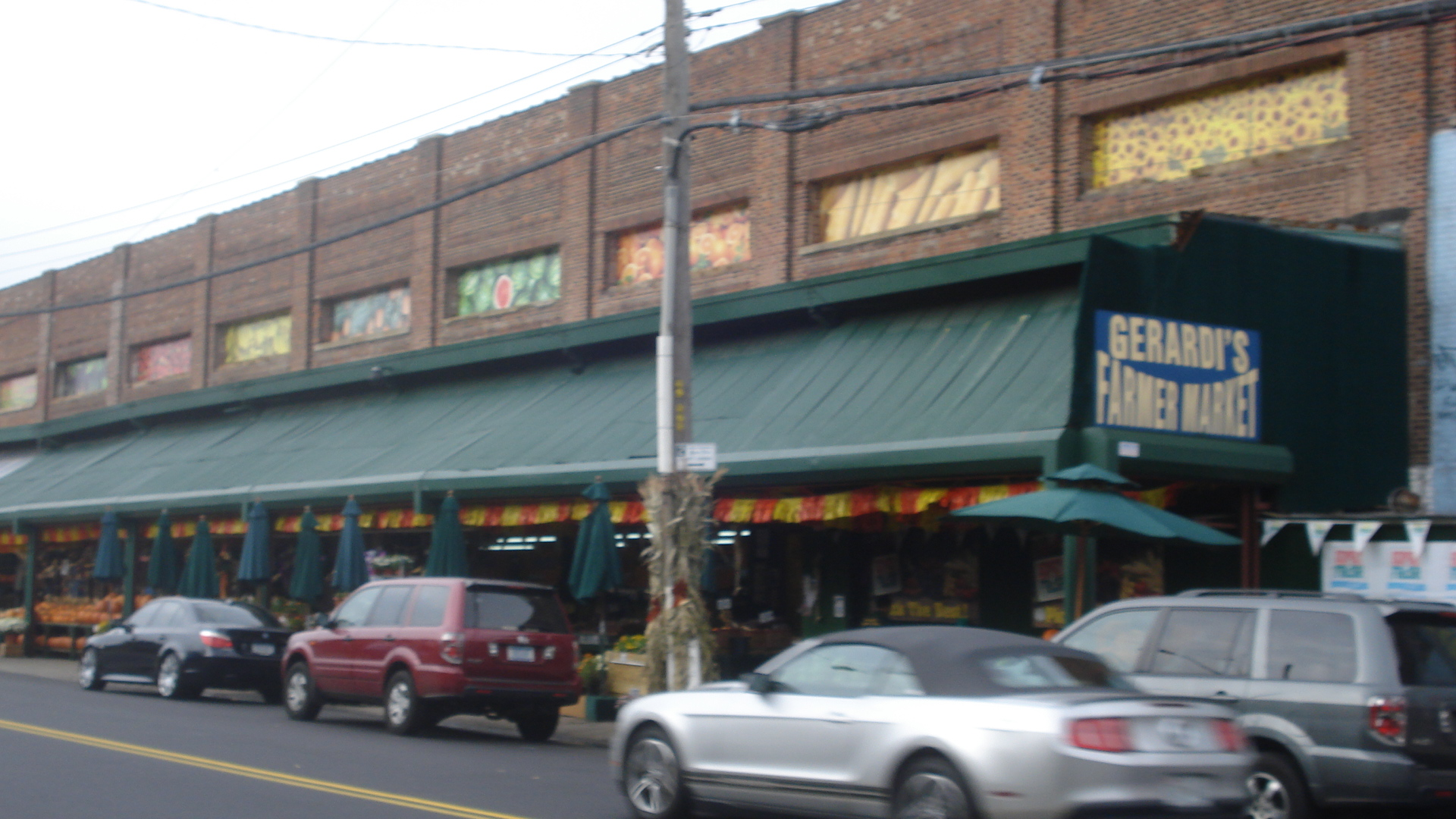
Gerardi's Farmers Market

Gerardi's Farmer Market, a local market on Richmond Terrace. The Farmer's Market carries fresh and local produce nearly year-round for the residents of New Brighton.

=== Hamilton Park subsection ===
Hamilton Park (sometimes known as Cottage Hill), laid out circa 1851-52 was probably the earliest suburban residential park on Staten Island and one of the first self-contained, limited access suburban subdivisions in the United States. Unconnected to the grid of surrounding streets until 1886, it is a large, elevated tract bounded by today's East Buchanan, Franklin, Prospect and York. Traces of the original carriage roads which wound through the wooded terrain are still visible. Hamilton Park is an old tight-knit community nestled in a sea of developments and low income housing projects. It sits on top of a hill known as "Brighton Heights" and ranks with Todt Hill as one of the highest points on the eastern seaboard below Maine.

The hilly streets of the Hamilton Park neighborhood feature rows of gingerbread-trimmed Victorian mansions and shingle-style homes erected during the Civil War era. A number of suburban country dwellings of 12 to 14 rooms, originally dubbed as "cottages", survive. 66 Harvard Avenue, also known as the C.K. Hamilton House, was built c.1853 as part of Hamilton Park Community Houses and is believed to be the first speculatively built "cottage" and is the only intact survivor of Hamilton Park's original suburban residences. Among German architect Carl Pfeiffer's first American commissions in the early 1860s were 12 houses built for Hamilton, many of which survive today. Although somewhat simpler and less picturesque than the earlier Harvard Avenue house, the brick, Italianate "cottage" at 105 Franklin Avenue boasts a magnificent arcaded loggia.

== Police and crime ==
New Brighton and the North Shore are patrolled by the 120th Precinct of the NYPD, located at 78 Richmond Terrace. The 120th Precinct ranked 12th safest out of 69 patrol areas for per-capita crime in 2010. As of 2018, with a non-fatal assault rate of 94 per 100,000 people, New Brighton and the North Shore's rate of violent crimes per capita is more than that of the city as a whole. The incarceration rate of 719 per 100,000 people is higher than that of the city as a whole.

The 120th Precinct has a lower crime rate than in the 1990s, with crimes across all categories having decreased by 83.3% between 1990 and 2022. The precinct reported seven murders, 14 rapes, 118 robberies, 384 felony assaults, 124 burglaries, 338 grand larcenies, and 136 grand larcenies auto in 2022.

== Fire safety ==
New Brighton is served by the New York City Fire Department (FDNY)'s Engine Co. 155/Ladder Co. 78, located at 14 Brighton Avenue.

== Health ==
As of 2018, preterm births and births to teenage mothers are more common in New Brighton and the North Shore than in other places citywide. In New Brighton and the North Shore, there were 96 preterm births per 1,000 live births (compared to 87 per 1,000 citywide), and 22.6 births to teenage mothers per 1,000 live births (compared to 19.3 per 1,000 citywide). New Brighton and the North Shore have a relatively average population of residents who are uninsured. In 2018, this population of uninsured residents was estimated to be 12%, the same as the citywide rate of 12%.

The concentration of fine particulate matter, the deadliest type of air pollutant, in New Brighton and the North Shore is 0.0071 milligrams per cubic metre (7.1×10^{−9} oz/ft^{3}), less than the city average. Sixteen percent of New Brighton and the North Shore residents are smokers, which is higher than the city average of 14% of residents being smokers. In New Brighton and the North Shore, 24% of residents are obese, 9% are diabetic, and 26% have high blood pressure—compared to the citywide averages of 24%, 11%, and 28% respectively. In addition, 21% of children are obese, compared to the citywide average of 20%.

Eighty-seven percent of residents eat some fruits and vegetables every day, which is the same as the city's average of 87%. In 2018, 77% of residents described their health as "good", "very good", or "excellent", equal to the city's average of 78%. For every supermarket in New Brighton and the North Shore, there are 28 bodegas.

The nearest major hospital is Richmond University Medical Center in West New Brighton.

== Post offices and ZIP Code ==
New Brighton is located within the ZIP Code 10301. The United States Postal Service operates the Saint George Station at 45 Bay Street and the West New Brighton Station at 1015 Castleton Avenue.

== Education ==
New Brighton and the North Shore generally have a lower rate of college-educated residents than the rest of the city as of 2018. While 37% of residents age 25 and older have a college education or higher, 15% have less than a high school education and 48% are high school graduates or have some college education. By contrast, 39% of Staten Island residents and 43% of city residents have a college education or higher. The percentage of New Brighton and the North Shore students excelling in math rose from 49% in 2000 to 65% in 2011, though reading achievement declined from 55% to 51% during the same time period.

New Brighton and the North Shore's rate of elementary school student absenteeism is slightly higher than the rest of New York City. In New Brighton and the North Shore, 25% of elementary school students missed twenty or more days per school year, more than the citywide average of 20%. Additionally, 73% of high school students in New Brighton and the North Shore graduate on time, about the same as the citywide average of 75%.

=== Schools ===
The New York City Department of Education operates the following public schools near New Brighton:

- PS 31 William T Davis (grades PK-5)
- IS 61 William A Morris (grades 6–8)
- PS 373 (grades PK-7)

The Roman Catholic Archdiocese of New York operates Staten Island Catholic schools. St. Peter-St. Paul Parish School is in New Brighton. In 2011 St. Peter moved from the former building in New Brighton to the former Saint Paul Elementary School in New Brighton, which had closed in 2006. The school changed its name after the move.

=== Libraries ===
The nearest library is the New York Public Library (NYPL)'s West New Brighton branch at 976 Castleton Avenue in West New Brighton. The NYPL also operates the St. George Library Center at 5 Central Avenue in St. George.

== Transportation ==
New Brighton was served by the Staten Island Railway's New Brighton station until March 31, 1953, when the entire North Shore Branch was shut down. As of 2019, it is served by the S40, S42, S44, S46, S52, S90, S94 and S96 local bus routes.

== Religion ==
The Roman Catholic Archdiocese of New York operates Catholic churches on Staten Island. In 2015 it announced that St. Paul's Chapel in New Brighton will close.

== Notable residents ==
- Walter Davis Lambert (1879–1968), geodesist, born in New Brighton
- Jennie Lozier (c. 1841–1915), physician, educator, died in New Brighton
- Mabel Normand (1893–1930), silent film actress, born in New Brighton
- Adolfas Ramanauskas (1918–1957), head of Lithuanian anti-Soviet resistance fighters.
- William Greenough Thayer (1863–1934), educator, born in New Brighton

Additionally, the movie Vox Lux has notable elements from New Brighton.

== See also ==
- List of Staten Island neighborhoods
- List of people from Staten Island
