= Judson–Litchfield House =

Historic house in Massachusetts, United States

- U.S. National Register of Historic Places
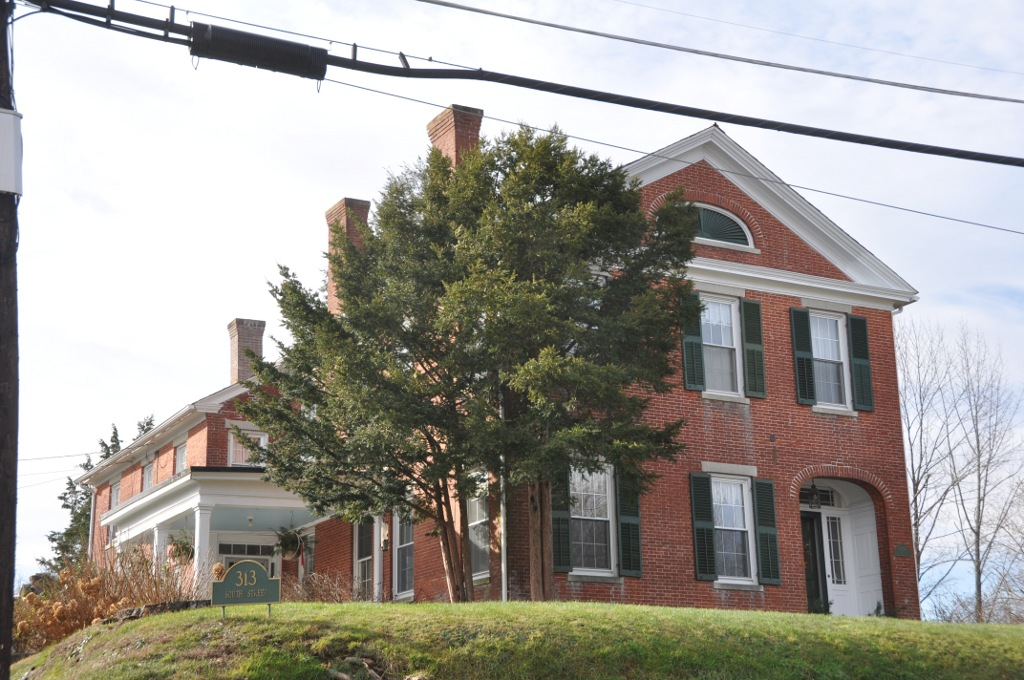

- Location within Massachusetts Location within the United States
- Location: 313 South St., Southbridge, Massachusetts
- Coordinates: 42°4′34″N 72°3′1″W
- Area: less than one acre
- Built: 1835
- Architectural style: Greek Revival, Federal
- MPS: Southbridge MRA
- NRHP reference No.: 89000539
- Added to NRHP: June 22, 1989

The Judson–Litchfield House is a historic house at 313 South Street in Southbridge, Massachusetts. Built sometime in the 1830s, it is a well-preserved local example of brick Greek Revival architecture, of which there are few surviving examples in the city. The house was listed on the National Register of Historic Places in 1989.

== Description and history ==
The Judson–Litchfield House is located on Southbridge's south side, on a rise on the south side of South Street. It is a 2 1/2-story brick structure, with a front-facing gable roof. Its front (north-facing facade) is three bays wide, with the entrance set in the right bay recessed in a segmented-arched opening, and windows set in openings with granite lintels and sills. The main gable is fully pedimented, with a louvered half-oval opening at its center. A porch added to the left of the building is a later 19th-century addition.

Built sometime in the 1830s, this house is an early example of a side entry gable front Greek Revival house, a style that became much more common in subsequent decades. An early local historian claimed that it was built to rival in style the Tiffany-Leonard House, another fine brick Greek Revival house located in the city center. This house was built for Samuel Judson, owner of one of Southbridge's early cotton mills. Later in the 19th century it was acquired by Libya Merritt Litchfield, treasurer and co-owner of the Litchfield shuttle factory. The Litchfield Company was founded in the early 1840s, and was one of Southbridge's oldest and most successful businesses.

== See also ==
- National Register of Historic Places listings in Southbridge, Massachusetts
- National Register of Historic Places listings in Worcester County, Massachusetts
