= Hamilton Millwright–Agent's House =

Historic house in Massachusetts, United States

- U.S. National Register of Historic Places
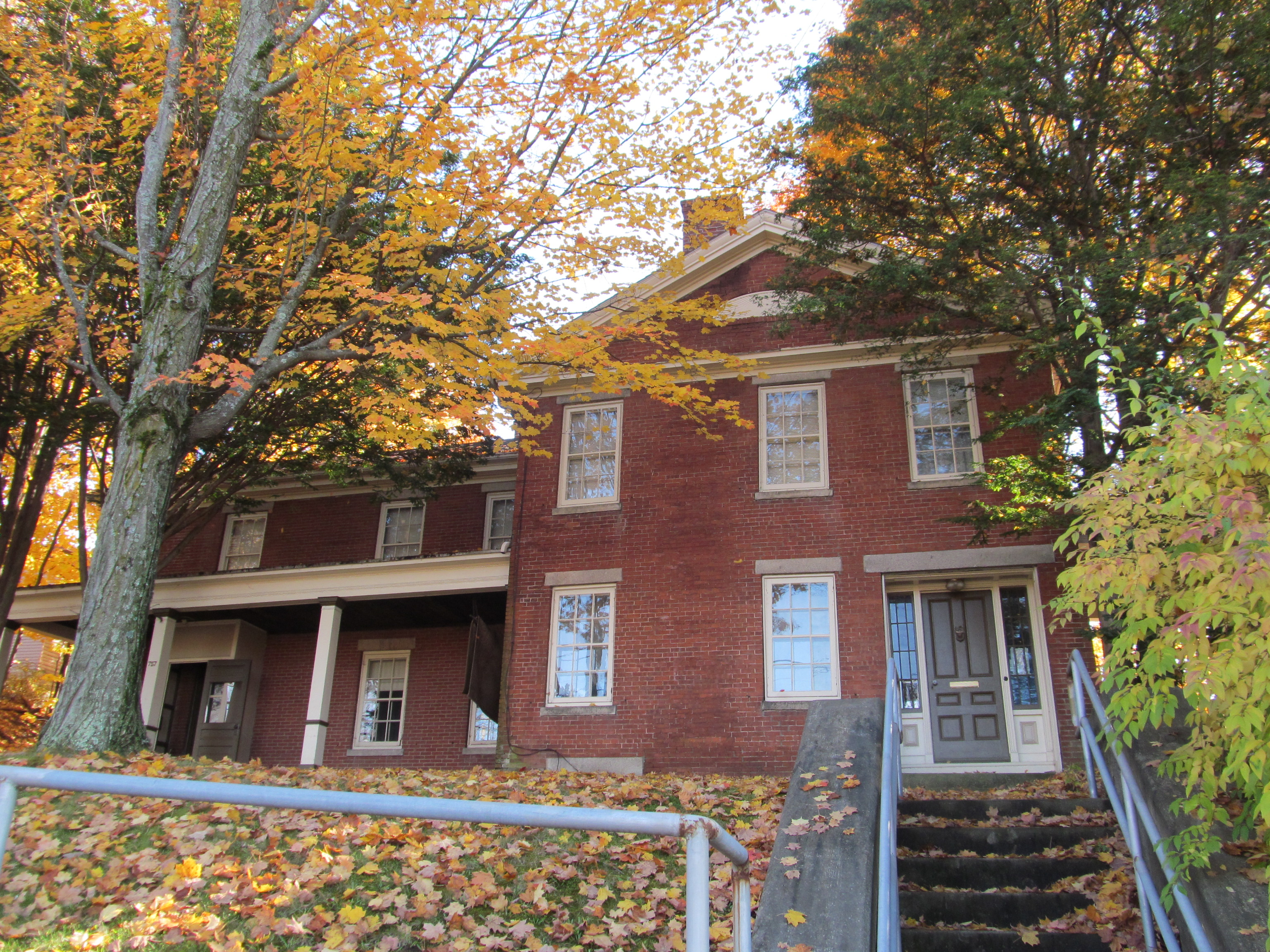
- 757 Main Street

- Location within Massachusetts Location within the United States
- Location: 757-761 Main St., Southbridge, Massachusetts
- Coordinates: 42°4′48″N 72°2′40″W
- Built: 1840
- Architectural style: Greek Revival, Federal
- MPS: Southbridge MRA
- NRHP reference No.: 89000543
- Added to NRHP: June 22, 1989

The Hamilton Millwright–Agent's House is a historic house at 757–761 Main Street in Southbridge, Massachusetts. Built about 1840, it is a rare surviving house from the Hamilton Woolen Company's early period of worker house construction. It is also rare as a brick house of the period; they were not commonly built in Southbridge at the time. The house was listed on the National Register of Historic Places in 1989.

== Description and history ==
The Hamilton Millwright–Agent's House is set on the south side of Main Street (Massachusetts Route 131), just near its junction with Hamilton Street in Southbridge's Globe Village. The house stands on a rise overlooking the former Hamilton Woolen Company mill. It has typical Greek Revival characteristics, and is stylistically similar to the Judson–Litchfield House on South Street. It has a doorway with sidelights and transom, and window openings with granite sills and lintels. There is a side ell, in front of which is a porch with Doric posts and a Greek entablature.

Although brick was not a house building material commonly used in Southbridge when this house was built c. 1840, most of the worker housing built by the Hamilton Woolen Mill Company was. This house was probably built for John Edwards Bacon, the millwright who built the 1836 Hamilton Company's mill, then the nation's largest mill building. By 1855 the house was occupied by the mill's agent, Joshua Ballard, who held leading positions in the company for forty years, during its period of greatest success.

== See also ==
- National Register of Historic Places listings in Southbridge, Massachusetts
- National Register of Historic Places listings in Worcester County, Massachusetts
