= New Brighton Village Hall =

Building in Staten Island, New York (1871–2004)

- U.S. National Register of Historic Places
- Location within New York City Location within New York Location within the United States
- Location: 66 Lafayette Avenue, New Brighton, Staten Island, New York 10301, USA
- Coordinates: 40°38′35″N 74°5′46″W
- Area: less than one acre
- Built: 1868-1871
- Architect: Whitford, James
- Architectural style: French Second Empire
- NRHP reference No.: 78001904
- Added to NRHP: December 15, 1978

New Brighton Village Hall was a historic village hall located at New Brighton, Staten Island, New York. It was built between 1868 and 1871 in the Second Empire style. It was a three-story brick building with a mansard roof sheathed with gray slate shingles.

It was added to the National Register of Historic Places in 1978.

Due to neglect, it was torn down in February 2004 and replaced with a residential building.
