= John Hamilton Farmstead =

- U.S. National Register of Historic Places
- U.S. Historic district
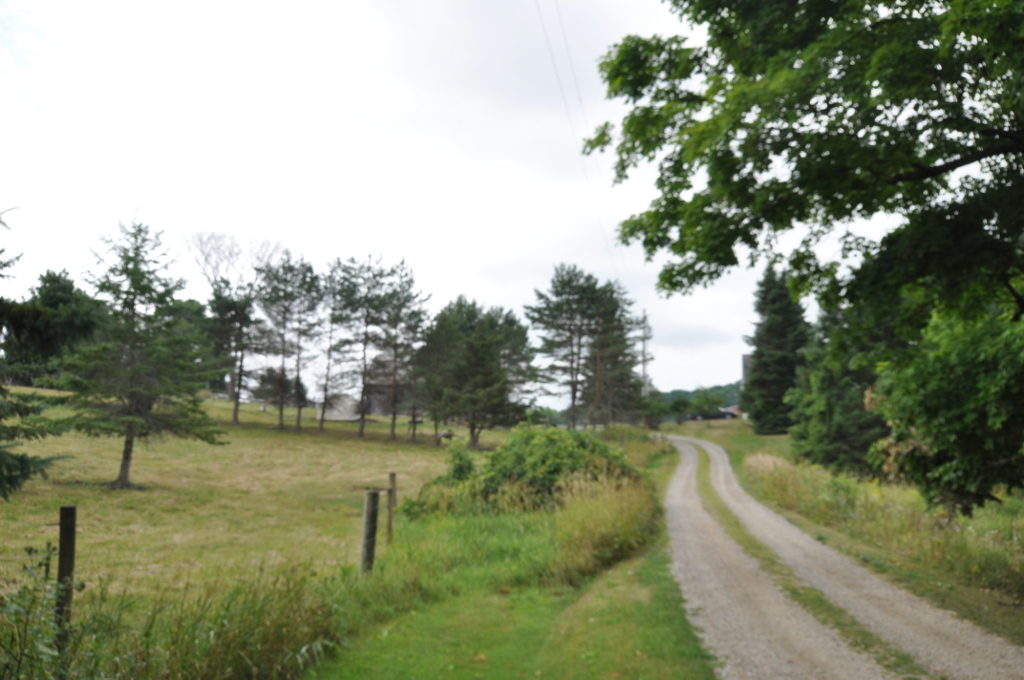

- Location within Vermont Location within the United States
- Location: VT 125, Bridport, Vermont
- Coordinates: 43°59′18″N 73°16′33″W
- Area: 115 acres (47 ha)
- Built: 1804
- Architectural style: Vernacular, Ground level bar
- MPS: Agricultural Resources of Vermont MPS
- NRHP reference No.: 93000531
- Added to NRHP: June 17, 1993

The John Hamilton Farmstead is a historic farm property on Vermont Route 125 in Bridport, Vermont. It was established in 1795 by John Hamilton, and includes one of Bridport's oldest surviving houses. It was listed on the National Register of Historic Places in 1993.

== Description and history ==
The Hamilton Farmstead is located in a rural area between the town center of Bridport and Middlebury, on the south side of Vermont Route 25 between Payne Drive and the Lemon Fair River. The property consists of 115 acres (47 ha) or farmland, most of which is flat and used for pasture or hay. The farm complex stands on the west side of a rise known locally as St. George's Hill, whose top and steeply sloped east side are wooded. The farmhouse is a 1 1/2-story Cape-style wood-frame structure, five bays wide, from which an ell and carriage house extend to the rear. Its oldest portion is a three-bay section built about 1795, while the other two bays were added c. 1820 and the ell about 1840. The interior retains some features, including flooring and exposed beams, reflective of its building history. Other outbuildings on the property include three 19th-century barns, the oldest dating to 1860, as well as a milkhouse, pumphouse, and garage.

The farmstead was developed beginning in 1795 by John Hamilton, one of three brothers who arrived from Barre, Massachusetts and are its first documented farmers. The property remained in the hands of Hamilton's descendants until 1894, when it was purchased by Maxime St. George, for whose family the hill is now named. The farm was historically had diversified production, with focus in the second half of the 19th century on dairy and sheep farming.

== See also ==
- National Register of Historic Places listings in Addison County, Vermont
