= Robert W. Hamilton House =

Historic house in Illinois, United States

- U.S. National Register of Historic Places
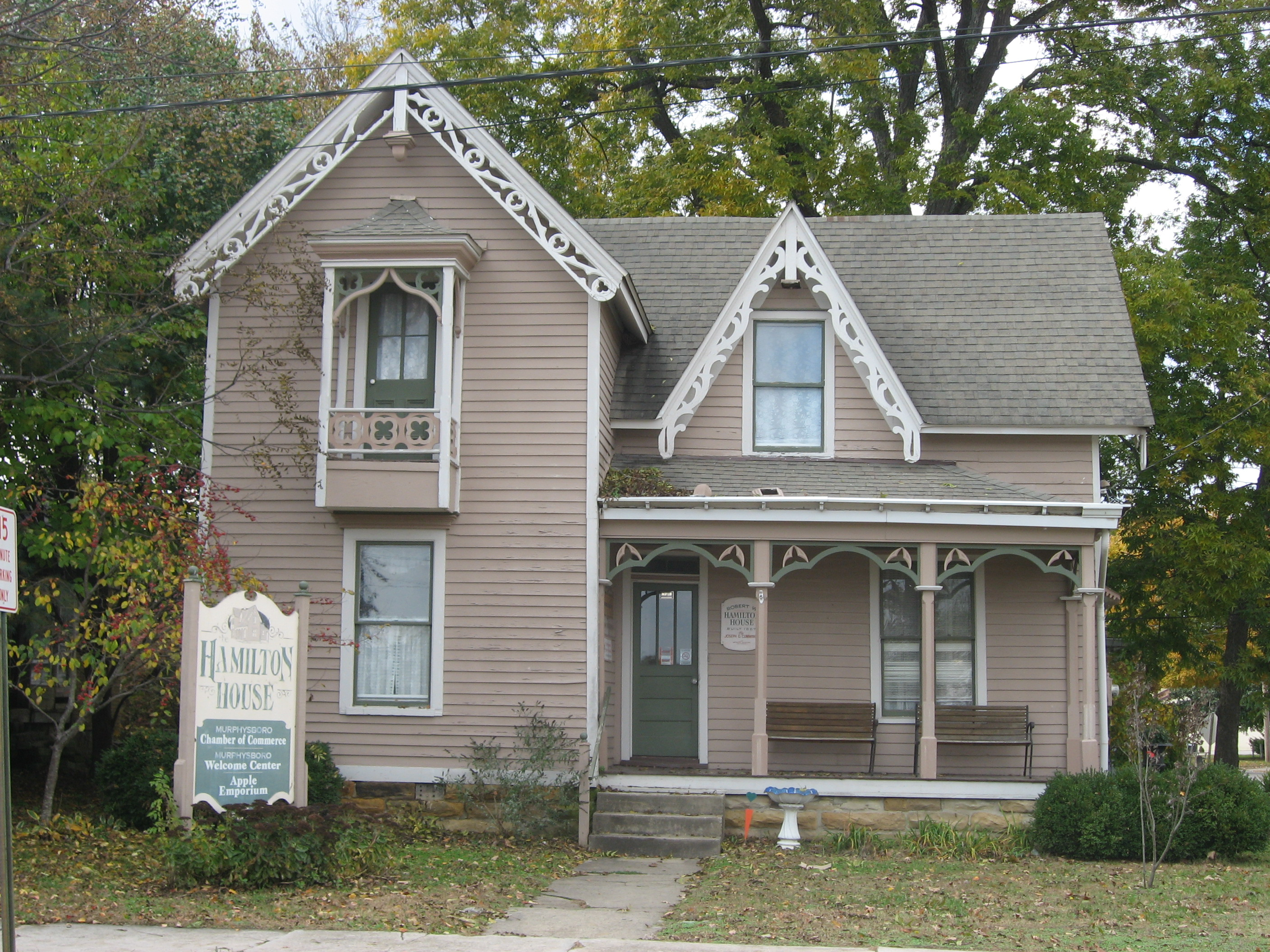

- Location within Illinois Location within the United States
- Location: 203 S. 13th St., Murphysboro, Illinois
- Coordinates: 37°45′46″N 89°20′13″W
- Area: less than one acre
- Built: 1867
- Architectural style: Carpenter Gothic
- NRHP reference No.: 82002540
- Added to NRHP: March 5, 1982

The Robert W. Hamilton House is a historic house located at 203 S. 13th St. in Murphysboro, Illinois. The house was built in 1867 for Robert Wood Hamilton, a Civil War veteran who served as circuit clerk of Jackson County and postmaster of Carbondale. The house is designed in the Carpenter Gothic style and is one of two remaining Carpenter Gothic residences in Jackson County. The front porch of the house is supported by four posts, which are linked at the top by trefoil arches. A steep dormer with ornamental bargeboards tops the porch. The opposite side of the front facade features a second-floor balcony with a quatrefoil-patterned railing. The gable end atop the balcony also features ornamental bargeboards.

The house was added to the National Register of Historic Places on March 5, 1982. It is currently occupied by Fager Historic Properties, K. Fager Contracting, And Brews Brothers Taproom Offices.
