= Hamilton Round Barn =

- U.S. National Register of Historic Places
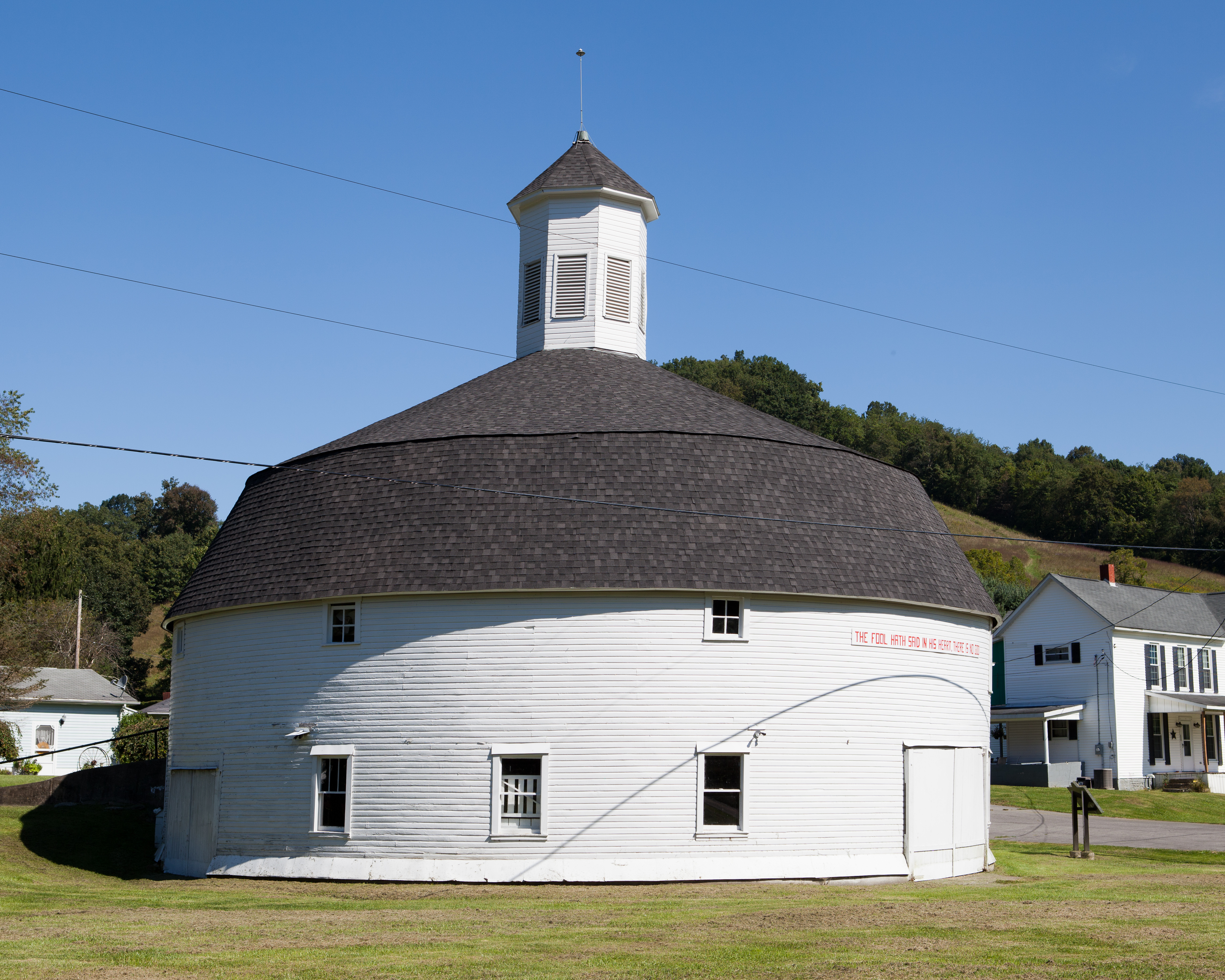

- Location within West Virginia Location within the United States
- Location: County Route 11, near Mannington, West Virginia
- Coordinates: 39°30′59.04″N 80°20′15.72″W
- Area: 1 acre (0.40 ha)
- Built: 1911
- Built by: Hamilton, A.A.
- Architectural style: Round Barn
- MPS: Round and Polygonal Barns of West Virginia TR
- NRHP reference No.: 85001548
- Added to NRHP: July 9, 1985

Hamilton Round Barn is a historic round barn located near Mannington, Marion County, West Virginia. It was built in 1911, and is circular in shape, measuring 66 feet in diameter and 75 feet high at the center. It features a gambrel roof topped by a six-sided cupola. The barn has horizontal clapboard siding of poplar, painted white, and a slate roof. In 1985, it was one of only five round and polygonal barns standing in West Virginia. The barn was purchased by the West Augusta Historical Society in 1983, and is operated as a museum.

It was listed on the National Register of Historic Places in 1985.
