= Vinton-Torrey House =

Historic house in Massachusetts, United States

- U.S. National Register of Historic Places
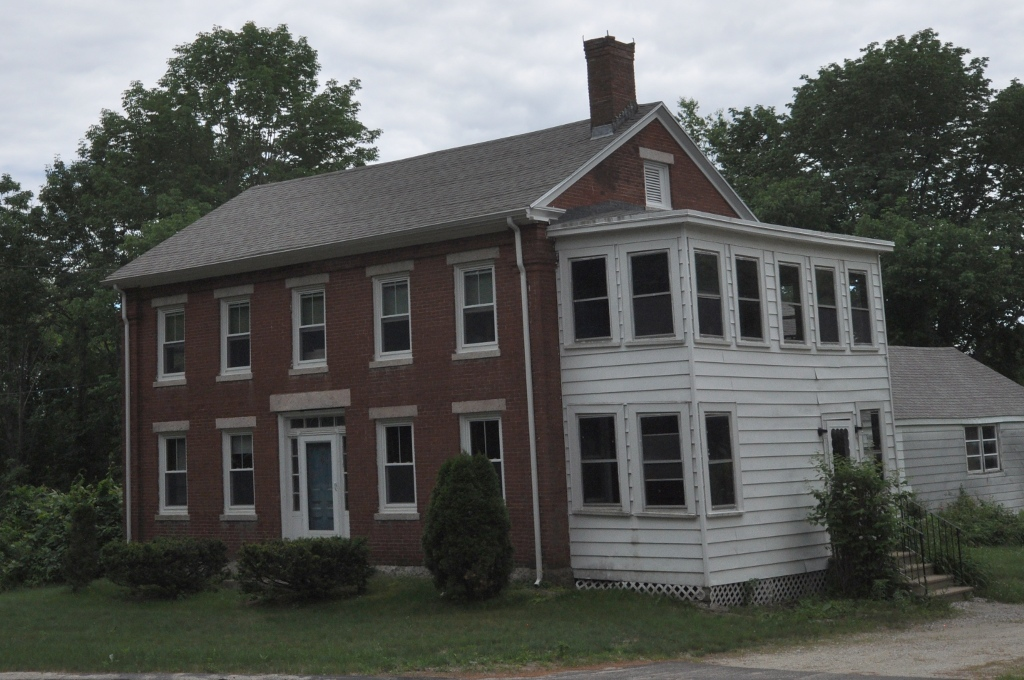

- Location within Massachusetts Location within the United States
- Location: 5 Torrey Rd., Southbridge, Massachusetts
- Coordinates: 42°5′5″N 72°0′32″W
- Built: 1841
- Architectural style: Greek Revival
- MPS: Southbridge MRA
- NRHP reference No.: 89000588
- Added to NRHP: June 22, 1989

The Vinton-Torrey House is a historic house at 5 Torrey Road in Southbridge, Massachusetts. It was built in 1841 by J. Eliot Vinton, whose ancestor John acquired the land in 1738. The 2 1/2-story brick house may incorporate elements of an earlier house (possibly part of John Vinton's original house). The house expresses some Greek Revival characteristics in brick, notably pilasters on the corners. The doors and windows feature granite lintels, and the slightly larger front overhang is a typical local feature. In the late 19th century the property belonged to E. M. Torrey.

The house was listed on the National Register of Historic Places in 1989.

== See also ==
- National Register of Historic Places listings in Southbridge, Massachusetts
- National Register of Historic Places listings in Worcester County, Massachusetts
