= Tiffany-Leonard House =

Historic house in Massachusetts, United States

- U.S. National Register of Historic Places
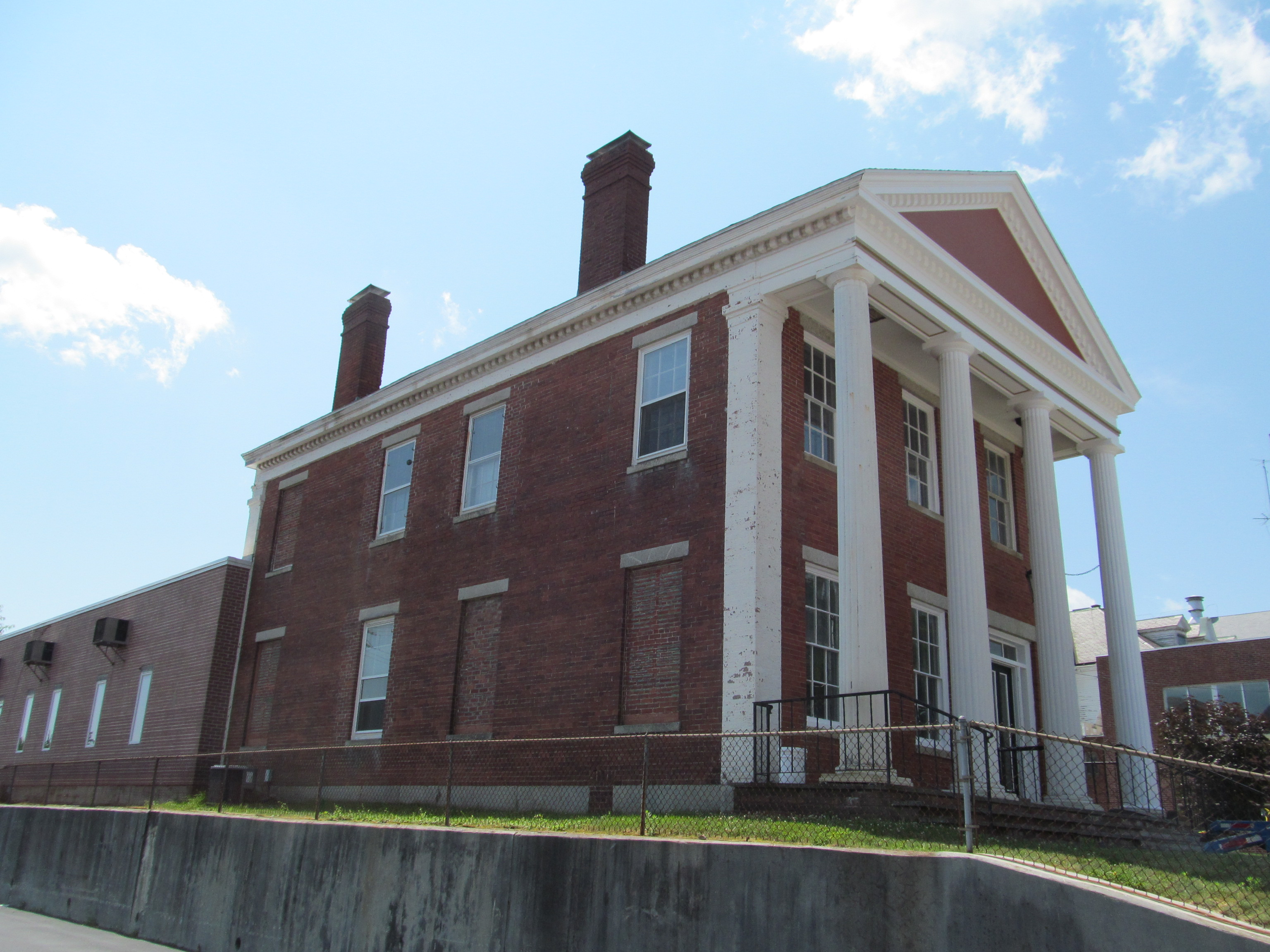
- Tiffany-Leonard House

- Location within Massachusetts Location within the United States
- Location: 25 Elm St., Southbridge, Massachusetts
- Coordinates: 42°4′26″N 72°2′4″W
- Built: 1832; 194 years ago
- Architectural style: Greek Revival
- MPS: Southbridge MRA
- NRHP reference No.: 89000590
- Added to NRHP: June 22, 1989; 37 years ago

The Tiffany-Leonard House (also known as The Southbridge News building) is a historic house at 25 Elm Street in Southbridge, Massachusetts. Built about 1832, it is a distinctive and high-quality local example of Greek Revival architecture, and is notable for its association with prominent local business owners. It was listed on the National Register of Historic Places in 1989.

== Description and history ==
The Tiffany-Leonard House is set on the east side of Elm Street, just south of Southbridge's downtown and opposite the Elm Street Fire House. It is a handsome two story brick structure, with a front-facing gable roof and a granite foundation. Its most prominent feature is its full height four-columned Greek Revival portico, which features fluted Doric columns supporting a full-pedimented and dentillated gable. The columns are narrower than often found on this type of house, a style reminiscent more of the Federal period. The building's front corners are pilasters, and the dentillated eave is continued around its sides. Windows (some bricked over) are set in openings with granite lintels and sills.

The house was built circa 1832 for Bella Tiffany, a business partner of mill owner Samuel Slater who cofounded the first cotton mill in nearby Webster. He also served as president of the local bank, and in the state legislature. By 1855 the house was owned by Manning Leonard, in whose hands it remained until late in the 19th century. Manning Leonard was also a local businessman and politician, holding significant shares in the Central Manufacturing Company.

== See also ==
- National Register of Historic Places listings in Southbridge, Massachusetts
- National Register of Historic Places listings in Worcester County, Massachusetts
