= Hamilton Park Community Houses =

Historic house in Staten Island, New York

- U.S. National Register of Historic Places
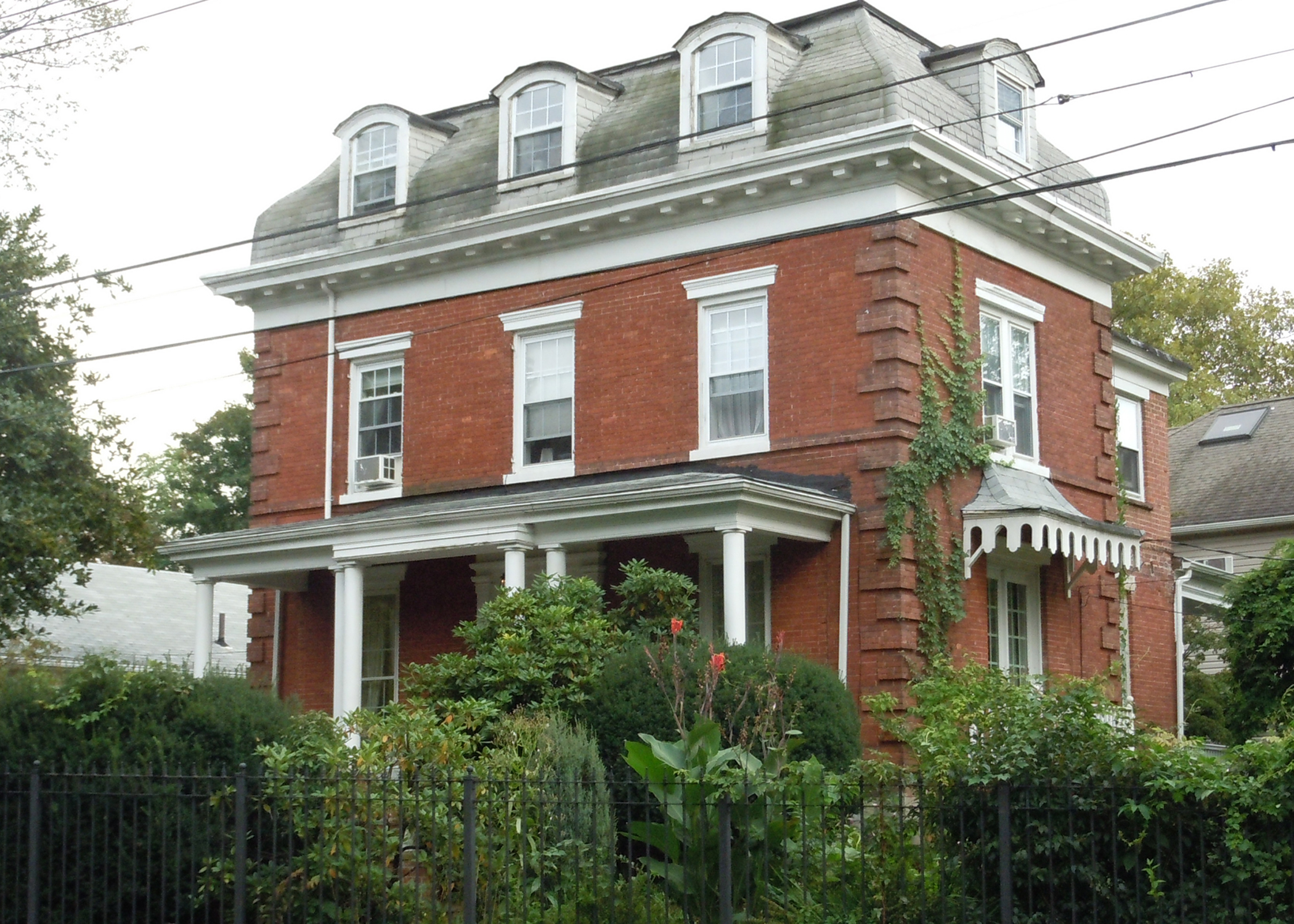
- 32 Park Place

- Location within New York City Location within New York Location within the United States
- Location: 105 Franklin Ave., 66 Harvard Ave., and 32 Park Pl., Staten Island, New York
- Coordinates: 40°38′30″N 74°5′27″W
- Area: 1.1 acres (0.45 ha)
- Built: 1853
- Architectural style: Second Empire, Italianate
- NRHP reference No.: 83003437
- Added to NRHP: September 26, 1983

Hamilton Park Community Houses are three historic homes located at New Brighton, Staten Island, New York. The Pritchard House (66 Harvard Ave., c. 1853) is a large, 2-story L-shaped brick building coated with rusticated stucco. No 32 Park Place (c. 1865) is a two-story, brick dwelling with a mansard roof. It features an Italianate style cornice. The Hamilton Park Cottage (105 Franklin Ave., ca. 1860s) is a 2 1/2-story red brick house. It features central triple arched porch over the main entrance.

It was added to the National Register of Historic Places in 1983.
