= James Hamilton House =

Historic house in Maryland, United States

- U.S. National Register of Historic Places
- Location within Maryland Location within the United States
- Location: 16810 Federal Hill Court Bowie, Maryland
- Coordinates: 38°54′30.25″N 76°42′41.5″W
- Built: ca. 1875
- Architect: Wyvill, John C.
- Architectural style: Victorian Gothic
- NRHP reference No.: 88002064
- Added to NRHP: November 10, 1988

The James Hamilton House is a historic home located in Bowie, Prince George's County, Maryland, United States. The home was built in the mid-1870s, and is a 2 1/2-story gable-roofed frame Late Victorian house with Italianate detail. Outbuildings include a board-and-batten meat house contemporary with the house, a garage constructed in the 1950s, and a large concrete block dairy barn to the east of the house, constructed in the 1960s.

The James Hamilton House was listed on the National Register of Historic Places in 1988.
