= Thomas Hamilton House (Calais, Maine) =

Historic house in Maine, United States

- U.S. National Register of Historic Places
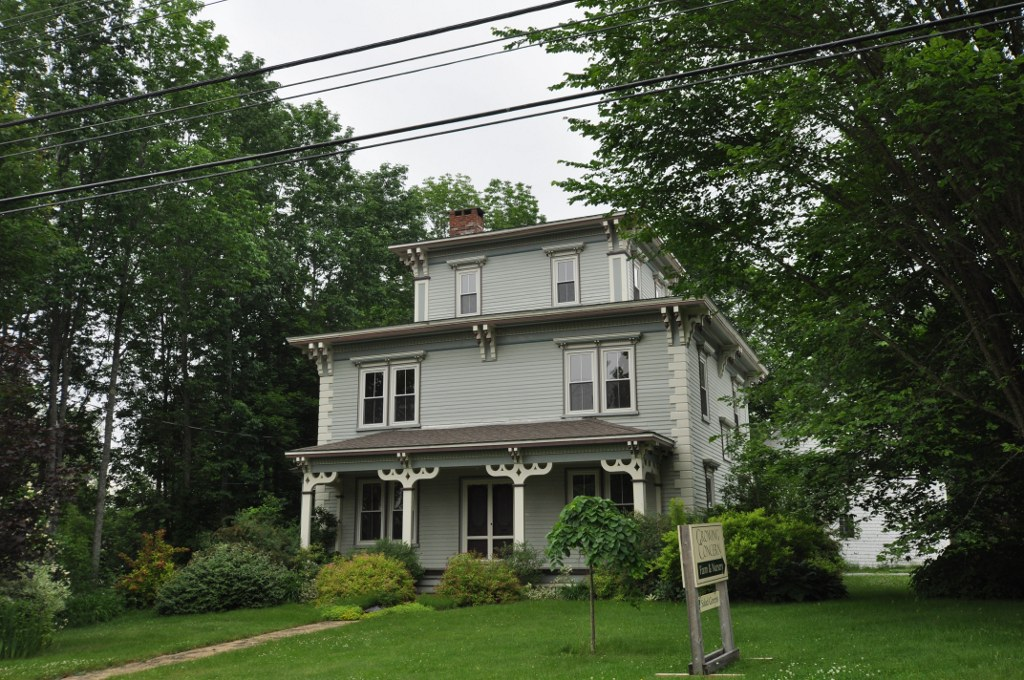

- Location within Maine Location within the United States
- Location: 78 South St., Calais, Maine
- Coordinates: 45°10′43″N 67°16′20″W
- Area: 0.5 acres (0.20 ha)
- Built: 1856
- Architectural style: Italianate
- NRHP reference No.: 82000788
- Added to NRHP: February 4, 1982

The Thomas Hamilton House is a historic house at 78 South Street in Calais, Maine. Built about 1857, it is a high-style Italianate house, unusual in its sophistication for what was then a remote frontier setting. Thomas Hamilton, the builder, had pretense at grandeur, and his house (lost due to overextended debt) became a local landmark known as "Hamilton's Folly". The house was listed on the National Register of Historic Places in 1982.

== Description and history ==
The Hamilton House is set at the northeast corner of South and Manning Streets, near the eastern edge of Calais' developed residential area. It is a two-story wood-frame structure, roughly square in shape, with a hip roof that is topped at its center by a full-height monitor section. The walls are finished with clapboards and quoining at the corners, and the eave has Italianate brackets. The main facade, facing southeast, has a single-story porch extending across its width, supported by square posts with elaborate bracketing at their tops, and in the cornice of its hip roof. Window surrounds have lintels with entablature and miniature brackets.

The house was built about 1857, by Thomas Hamilton, a local businessman. Hamilton had apparently met with some success in his business endeavours, for he was able to build this house, acquire fancy dress, and purchased expensive horses and carriages. These costs apparently overextended him financially, for the house was soon mortgaged and lost, and Hamilton is reported to have died in the poor house. In the 20th century the house was owned by Calais Mayor Clarence Beckett, who hosted several Maine governors.

== Present-day ==
The Hamilton House underwent extensive renovation in the spring of 2017 and now serves as the dental practice of Karen Delaney, DDS.

== See also ==
- National Register of Historic Places listings in Washington County, Maine
