= Martin Hamilton House =

Historic house in West Virginia, United States

- U.S. National Register of Historic Places
- Location within West Virginia Location within the United States
- Location: WV 39, Summersville, West Virginia
- Coordinates: 38°17′14″N 80°51′37″W
- Area: less than one acre
- Built: 1893
- NRHP reference No.: 99001403
- Added to NRHP: November 22, 1999

Martin Hamilton House, also known as the Hamilton House Museum, is a historic home located at Summersville, Nicholas County, West Virginia. It was built in 1893, and is a simple one-story, frame dwelling with clapboard siding and a corrugated metal roof. An eight-foot addition was built in 1936. It was donated to the Nicholas County Historical and Genealogical Society in 1985, and is used as a museum and genealogical library.

It was listed on the National Register of Historic Places in 1999.
