= Porfimer sodium =

Pharmaceutical drug

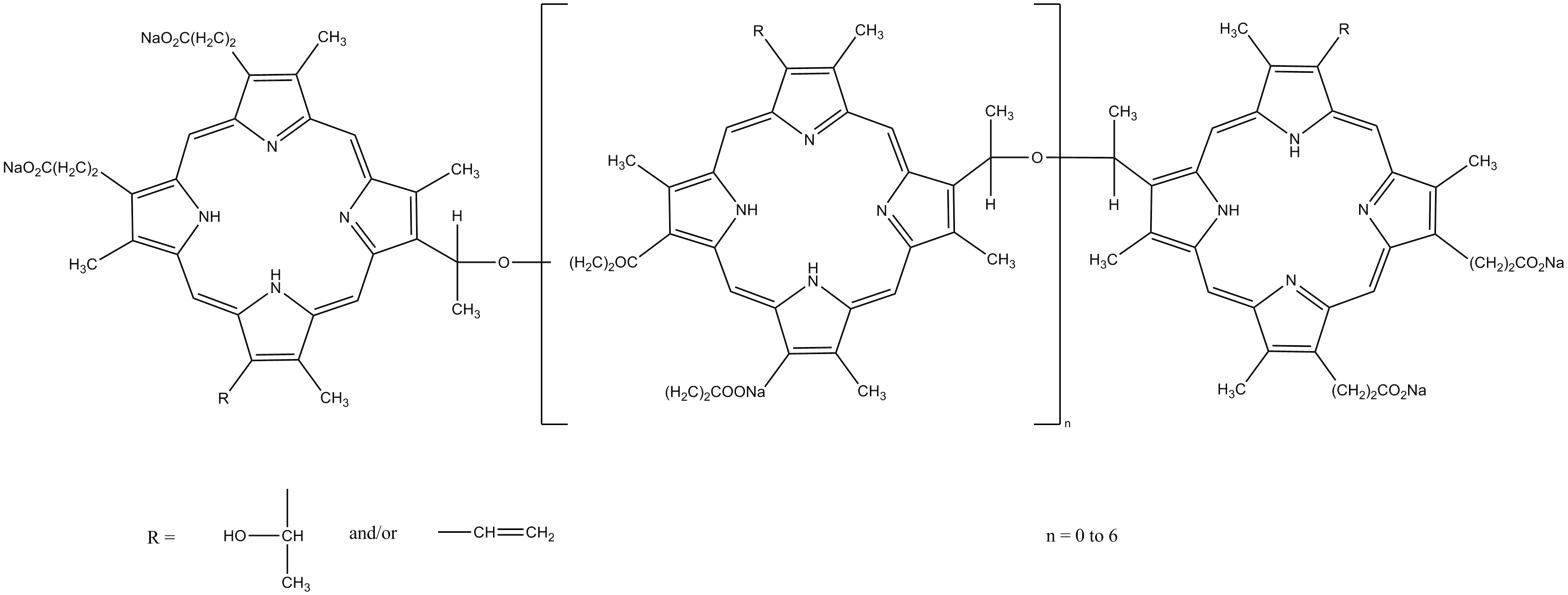

Clinical data
- Trade names: Photofrin
- AHFS/Drugs.com: Consumer Drug Information
- License data: EU EMA: by INN; US FDA: Photofrin
- Routes of administration: Intravenous
- ATC code: L01XD01 (WHO)

Legal status
- Legal status: US: ℞-only

Pharmacokinetic data
- Bioavailability: NA
- Protein binding: ~90%
- Elimination half-life: 21.5 days (mean)
- Excretion: Fecal

Identifiers
- CAS Number: 87806-31-3; ethyl ether: 97067-70-4
- PubChem CID: 57166
- DrugBank: DB00707
- ChemSpider: 10482283
- UNII: Y3834SIK5F; ethyl ether: 625J2HS54G
- ChEMBL: ChEMBL1201707

Chemical and physical data
- Formula: C_{68}H_{74}N_{8}O_{11} (for n=0)
- Molar mass: 1179.36 g/mol (for n=0) g·mol^{−1}
- 3D model (JSmol): Interactive image
- SMILES: [Na+].CC(O)C1=C(C)C=2C=C5NC(=CC4=NC(=CC=3NC(C=C1N=2)=C(C)C=3CCC(O)=O)C(CCC(O)=O)=C4C)C(C)=C5C(C)OC(C)C6=C(C)C=7C=C%10NC(=CC9=NC(=CC=8NC(C=C6N=7)=C(C)C=8CCC(O)=O)C(CCC(O)=O)=C9C)C(C)=C%10C(C)O
- InChI: InChI=1S/C68H74N8O11.Na/c1-29-41(13-17-61(79)80)53-28-56-44(16-20-64(85)86)32(4)48(72-56)24-59-68(36(8)52(76-59)25-58-65(37(9)77)33(5)49(73-58)21-45(29)69-53)40(12)87-39(11)67-35(7)50-22-46-30(2)42(14-18-62(81)82)54(70-46)27-55-43(15-19-63(83)84)31(3)47(71-55)23-57-66(38(10)78)34(6)51(74-57)26-60(67)75-50;/h21-28,37-40,71-73,75,77-78H,13-20H2,1-12H3,(H,79,80)(H,81,82)(H,83,84)(H,85,86);/q;+1/b45-21-,46-22-,47-23-,48-24-,49-21-,50-22-,51-26-,52-25-,53-28-,54-27-,55-27-,56-28-,57-23-,58-25-,59-24-,60-26-; Key:CGQHMICGJYKFFJ-ZLJVSRBASA-N

Porfimer sodium, sold as Photofrin, is a photosensitizer used in photodynamic therapy and radiation therapy and for palliative treatment of obstructing endobronchial non-small cell lung carcinoma and obstructing esophageal cancer.

Porfimer is a mixture of oligomers formed by ether and ester linkages of up to eight porphyrin units. In practice, a red light source emitting at 630 nm is used to excite the Porfimer oligomers.

Porfimer is Haematoporphyrin Derivative (HpD) (See PDT).

== Approvals and indications ==
It was approved in Canada in 1993 for the treatment of bladder cancer. It was approved in Japan in 1994 (for early stage lung cancer?). It was approved by the U.S. FDA in December 1995 for esophageal cancer, and in 1998, it was approved for the treatment of early non-small cell lung cancer.

In August 2003 the FDA approved its use for Barrett's esophagus.
