= Malignancy =

Tendency of a medical condition to become progressively worse

- Other names: Cancer, malignant neoplasm
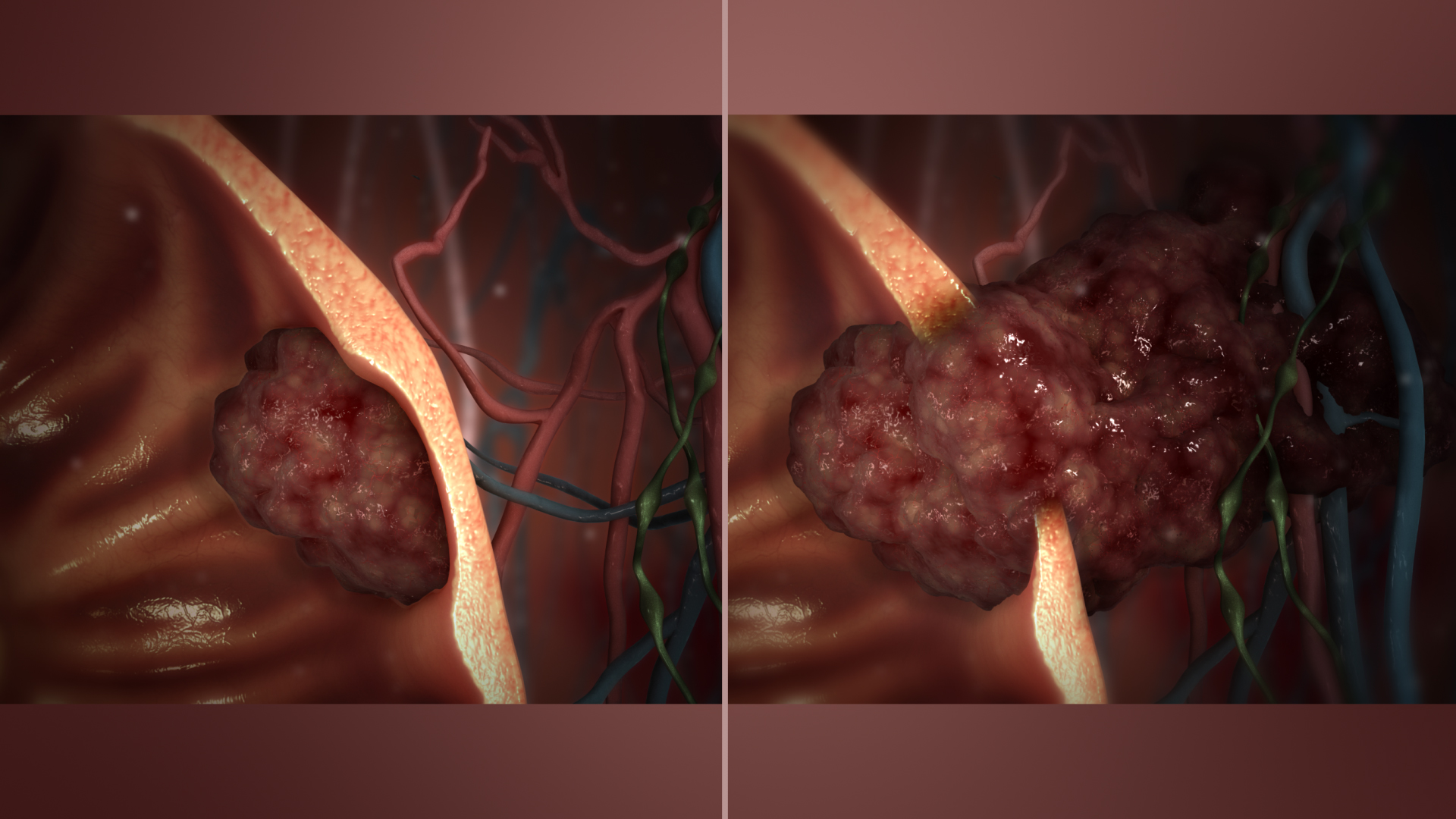
- Malignant tumor (right) spreads uncontrollably and invades the surrounding tissues; benign tumor (left) remains self-contained from neighbouring tissue
- Specialty: Oncology
- Symptoms: Fatigue, lump(s), change in skin, abnormal bleeding, prolonged cough, unexplained weight loss
- Risk factors: Smoking, sun exposure, genetics—history of malignancy, solid organ transplantation (post-transplant malignancy), infectious diseases
- Diagnostic method: Biopsy
- Treatment: Photoradiation therapy, surgery, chemotherapy, hyperthermia
- Frequency: 442.4 per 100,000 per year
- Deaths: c. 10 million per year

Malignancy (from Latin male 'badly' and -gnus 'born') is the tendency of a medical condition to become progressively worse; the term is most familiar as a characterization of cancer.

A malignant tumor contrasts with a non-cancerous benign tumor in that a malignancy is not self-limited in its growth, is capable of invading into adjacent tissues, and may be capable of spreading to distant tissues.

A benign tumor has none of those properties, but may still be harmful to health. The term benign in more general medical use characterizes a condition or growth that is not cancerous, i.e. does not spread to other parts of the body or invade nearby tissue. Sometimes the term is used to suggest that a condition is not dangerous or serious, although this is not always the case.

Malignancy in cancers is characterized by anaplasia, invasiveness, and metastasis. Malignant tumors are also characterized by genome instability: cancers, as assessed by whole genome sequencing, frequently have between 10,000 and 100,000 mutations in their entire genomes. Cancers usually show tumour heterogeneity, containing multiple subclones. They also frequently have reduced expression of DNA repair enzymes due to epigenetic methylation of DNA repair genes or altered microRNAs that control DNA repair gene expression.

Tumours often manifest as a visible lump on the body. A mammogram or MRI scan can be used to determine or detect a suspected tumour, particularly if there is no visible lump. If an apparent tumour is detected, a biopsy—examination of a small sample of the tissue in a laboratory—is required to make a definitive diagnosis, and distinguish whether the tumour is malignant or benign. Malignant, and some benign, tumours usually require treatment, which is most effective at an early stage of tumour development. Treatment may be by chemotherapy, surgery, ionising radiation, hyperthermia, and other means.

== Signs and symptoms ==
When malignant cells form, symptoms do not typically appear until there has been a significant growth of the mass. Once signs and symptoms do arise, they are dependent on the location, size and type of malignancy. Usually, it is quite general and can be associated with other illnesses or diseases and thus, can be difficult to diagnose or can be misdiagnosed.

Signs include observable or measurable aspects such as weight loss (without trying), a fever or unusual bleeding. On the other hand, symptoms are felt internally by the individual such as fatigue or changes in appetite. A general list of common signs and symptoms includes pain (headaches or bone aches), skin changes (new moles or bumps), coughing and unusual bleeding. There are also signs and symptoms specific to females including belly pain and bloating or breast changes i.e., the formation of a lump. Signs and symptoms specific to males include pain or growths in the scrotum or difficulty urinating.

== Causes ==
Malignant cells often evolve due to a combination of reasons rather than one definitive reason. Reasons which can explain their development include genetics and family history, triggers such as infectious diseases, and exposure to risk factors.

=== Triggers ===
Infectious diseases play a role in the development of malignancy, with agents of infectious disease being able to produce a multitude of malignant cells. These include bacterial causes, fungal and parasitic causes, and viral causes. Bacteria, fungi and similar pathogens have the ability to form an environment within states of chronic inflammation which gives rise to oncogenic potential. Viral agents are able to assist the formation of malignant tumours due to a mechanism of cell transformation. This cell transformation can occur through either "DNA integration or cellular-DNA alteration of growth regulator genes". Inflammation can also play a role in triggering malignancy as it can promote stages of tumour formation. The main purpose of inflammation is to repair tissue, defend the body against pathogens and regenerate cells. At the same time, inflammatory cells can also interact with malignant cells to form an inflammatory tumour microenvironment. This environment increases the likelihood of forming malignant cells through blockage of anti-tumour immunity. Once this occurs, the inflammatory tumour microenvironment begins to send out tumour-promoting signals to epithelial cells, triggering the formation of malignant cells.

=== Risk factors ===
Traditional risk factors of developing malignancy include smoking, sun exposure, and having a history of cancer in the family. Other risk factors include developing post-transplant malignancy which occurs subsequent to solid organ transplantations.

==== Post-transplant malignancy ====
Individuals who undergo organ transplant surgery have an increased risk of developing malignancy in comparison to the general population. The most common form of malignancy being "nonmelanoma skin cancer and posttransplant lymphoproliferative disorders". The different types of malignancy developed post-transplant depend on which organ was transplanted. This is linked to recipients being at a higher risk when exposed to traditional risk factors as well as, the type and intensity of the operation, the duration of their immunosuppression post-operation, and the risk of developing oncogenic viral infections.

== Management ==
There are various treatment forms available to help manage malignancy. Common treatments include chemotherapy, radiation, and surgical procedures. Photoradiation and hyperthermia are also used as treatment forms to kill or reduce malignant cells. A large portion of patients are at risk of death when diagnosed with malignancy as the disease has usually progressed for a number of years before detection.

=== Surgery ===
Surgery can help manage or treat malignancy by either removing the tumour, localising it and/or determining whether there has been a spread to other organs. When undertaking surgery for malignancy, there are six major objectives which are considered. These include "prevention of cancer, diagnosis and staging of disease, disease cure, tumour debulking, symptom palliation and patient rehabilitation".

Surgical prevention of cancer largely consists of removing the organ at risk of developing malignancy. This would occur if an individual is predisposed to the formation of malignant cells as a result of inherited genetic mutations and acquired diseases.

Surgical diagnosis of malignancy involves completing a biopsy. This process requires a sufficient amount of tissue to make a confident diagnosis, and the handling of specimen to expand information provided from testing. Biopsies are categorised into four different processes: "fine-needle aspirate (FNA), core needle, incisional, and excisional".

Curative surgery (also known as primary surgery) can be conducted when the malignant tumour has only invaded one area of the body. The objective is to remove the entirety of the malignant cells without violating the tumour; if the tumour is violated, the risk of both tumour spillage and wound implantation would increase.

The surgical procedure of tumour debulking can be undertaken to increase the effectiveness of postoperative forms of treatment. Symptom palliation and patient rehabilitation do not play a role in controlling or reducing malignancy growth rather, they increase the patient's quality of life.

=== Photoradiation ===
Hematoporphyrin derivative (HPD) is a drug which was developed to be absorbed by malignant cells and only becomes active when exposed to light. It is commonly used to identify and localise cancers as when it is under activation of blue light the red fluorescence of the malignant tumour (due to the HPD) can be observed easily.

The combination of HPD with red light (photoradiation) has been used on various malignant tumours including malignant melanomas and carcinomas on a range of different organs including the breast and colon. This form of treatment produces a singlet oxygen through the photodynamic process; where the oxygen molecule exists in an electronically excited state. The singlet oxygen is a cytotoxic agent which holds the ability to eradicate malignant cells by preventing both nucleic acid and protein synthesis. The treatment process also utilises HPD's capability of accumulating at higher levels in malignant tissues compared to most other tissues.

In the case of deeply pigmented or larger tumours, a stronger course of this treatment process is required in order to be effective.

=== Hyperthermia ===
Malignancy can be treated through the use of hyperthermia by applying either surgical perfusion or interstitial techniques to the body. The use of this treatment type largely depends on the fact that malignant and normal cells have differing responses to the energy source used. This dependency is due to the intracellular changes which occur during hyperthermia; as the nucleic acids, cell membrane, and cytoskeleton within each cell is affected indirectly and/or through multiple pathways. The combination of these intracellular changes means there is no specific target of cell death in the hyperthermic process.

=== Chemotherapy ===
Chemotherapy is commonly used as either the primary treatment or in conjunction with other treatment forms such as radiotherapy or surgery. It can be administered through "injection, intra-arterial (IA), intraperitoneal (IP), intrathecal (IT), intravenous (IV), topical or oral".

The purpose of chemotherapy is to use cytotoxic agents which kill rapidly dividing cells within the body. It targets the cellular mechanisms which allow the development of malignancy throughout the body. There are no specific areas which are targeted and so, there is a lack of differentiation between normal and malignant cells, resulting in a range of side effects. This includes bone marrow suppression, gastrointestinal problems, and alopecia. Some side effects are specific to the anticancer drug used, the most common being bone marrow suppression as bone marrow has the ability to divide rapidly due to high growth fraction. This is because anticancer drugs have the highest activity in high growth fraction tissues.

Alkylating agents are used in chemotherapy as these are chemically reactive drugs which form covalent bonds when reacting with DNA. This results in breaks within DNA strands causing either inter-strand or intra-strand DNA cross-linking. The sub-classes of alkylating agents are "nitrogen mustards, oxazaphosphorines, alkyl alkane, sulfonates, nitrosoureas, tetrazines, and aziridines."

== Epidemiology ==
Malignancy has been a constant global health concern for a number of years, resulting in significant social and economic impacts on individuals with malignancy and their families. The risk of developing malignancy is 20.2%. In 2018, 18 million patients were diagnosed with a malignant tumour with lung, breast and prostate being the most common form. Additionally, there were approximately 10 million mortalities due to cancer in 2020, and there is an overall trend which demonstrated that malignant mortality has increased by 28% over the past 15 years.

Lung cancer has the highest mortality rate in comparison to other forms of cancer, with the leading cause of development due to smoking. The number of smokers in China is rapidly increasing with tobacco killing approximately 3000 people each day. The diagnosis of lung cancer is most common within the 50–59-year age bracket. Further, it caused 1.8 million deaths in 2020 alone.

In those aged 14 or younger, leukaemia is the most frequent form of malignancy with the brain and nervous system subsequent. These individuals account for approximately 1% of the cancer mortality rate – about 110,000 children each year. In the 15–49-year-old age bracket the most common form of malignancy is breast cancer with liver and lung cancer following. Finally, those aged 60 and over mainly develop lung, colorectal, stomach, and liver malignancy.

Uses of "malignant" in oncology include:

- Malignancy, malignant neoplasm and malignant tumor are synonymous with cancer
- Malignant ascites
- Malignant transformation

Non-oncologic disorders referred to as "malignant" include:

- Malignant hypertension
- Malignant hyperthermia
- Malignant otitis externa
- Malignant tertian malaria (malaria caused specifically by Plasmodium falciparum)
- Neuroleptic malignant syndrome

== See also ==
- Precancerous condition
