= Talaporfin =

Chemical compound

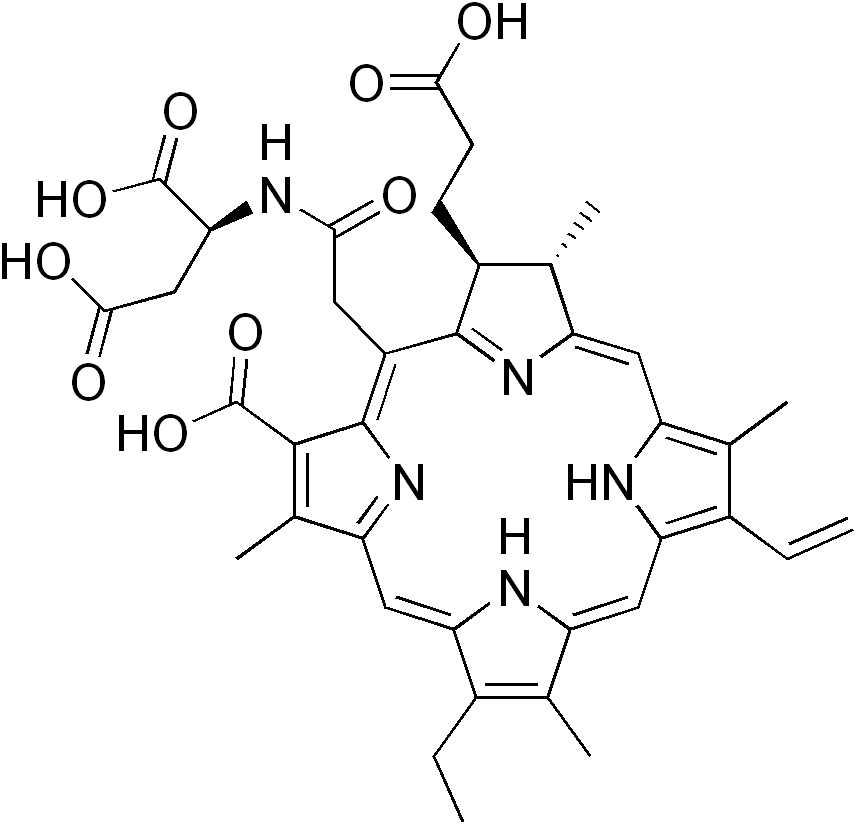

Clinical data
- AHFS/Drugs.com: International Drug Names
- Routes of administration: IV
- ATC code: none

Legal status
- Legal status: In general: ℞ (Prescription only)

Identifiers
- IUPAC name: N-{[(2S,3S)-7-carboxy-3-(2-carboxyethyl)-12-ethyl-2,8,13,18-tetramethyl-17-vinyl-2,3-dihydroporphyrin-5-yl]acetyl}-L-aspartic acid
- CAS Number: 110230-98-3 220201-34-3 (sodium salt)
- PubChem CID: 5486799
- DrugBank: DB11812
- ChemSpider: 16737134
- UNII: P4ROX5ELT2
- CompTox Dashboard (EPA): DTXSID101318471

Chemical and physical data
- Formula: C_{38}H_{41}N_{5}O_{9}
- Molar mass: 711.772 g·mol^{−1}
- 3D model (JSmol): Interactive image
- SMILES: CCC1=C2C=C3C(=C(C(=N3)C(=C4[C@H]([C@@H](C(=N4)C=C5C(=C(C(=CC(=C1C)N2)N5)C=C)C)C)CCC(=O)O)CC(=O)N[C@@H](CC(=O)O)C(=O)O)C(=O)O)C
- InChI: InChI=1S/C38H41N5O9/c1-7-20-16(3)24-12-26-18(5)22(9-10-32(45)46)35(42-26)23(11-31(44)41-30(37(49)50)15-33(47)48)36-34(38(51)52)19(6)27(43-36)14-29-21(8-2)17(4)25(40-29)13-28(20)39-24/h7,12-14,18,22,30,39,43H,1,8-11,15H2,2-6H3,(H,41,44)(H,45,46)(H,47,48)(H,49,50)(H,51,52)/b24-12-,25-13-,26-12-,27-14-,28-13-,29-14-,35-23-,36-23-/t18-,22-,30-/m0/s1; Key:VSEIDZLLWQQJGK-WSUYNKMOSA-N

Talaporfin (INN, also known as aspartyl chlorin, mono-L-aspartyl chlorin e6, NPe6, or LS11) is a chlorin based photosensitizer used in photodynamic therapy (PDT).

It absorbs red light at 664-667 nm normally provided by a laser tuned to this wavelength.

It was approved in Japan (in 2004) for PDT of lung cancer and marketed as Laserphyrin.
