= Photocure =

Norwegian pharmaceutical company

Photocure ASA
- Company type: Allmennaksjeselskap
- Traded as: OSE: PHO
- Industry: Pharmaceutical
- Founded: 1993
- Headquarters: Oslo, Norway
- Key people: Daniel Schneider (CEO), Jan Egberts (Chairperson of the board)
- Products: Hexvix; Cysview
- Revenue: NOK 150 million
- Number of employees: 70
- Website: www.photocure.com

Photocure ASA is a Norwegian specialty pharma company that develops and sells pharmaceuticals and medical devices based on proprietary photodynamic technology. Photocure's strategy in cancer is to continue the commercialization of Hexvix for bladder cancer diagnostics, and continue the development of the cancer portfolio and out-license prior to phase III studies. This strategy is based on a strong platform of intellectual property in photodynamic therapy.

== Pharmaceuticals ==
Hexyl aminolevulinate hydrochloride for diagnosis of bladder cancer.
