= Cevira =

Cevira is in development as a local treatment for Cervical intraepithelial neoplasia lesions and human papilloma virus (HPV) of the cervix without damaging healthy tissue. With Cevira, Photocure aims to develop the first non-surgical treatment for precancerous cervical lesions using photodynamic therapy (PDT). Cevira treatment is administered locally and remains in contact with the cervix to deliver treatment for up to 24 hours. A cup holds the ointment against the cervix for initial absorption. After a few hours, a light source within the cup emits light at a specific wavelength so the Active Pharmaceutical Ingredient, hexylaminolevulinate (HAL), reacts with the tissue.
