= Temoporfin =

Chemical compound

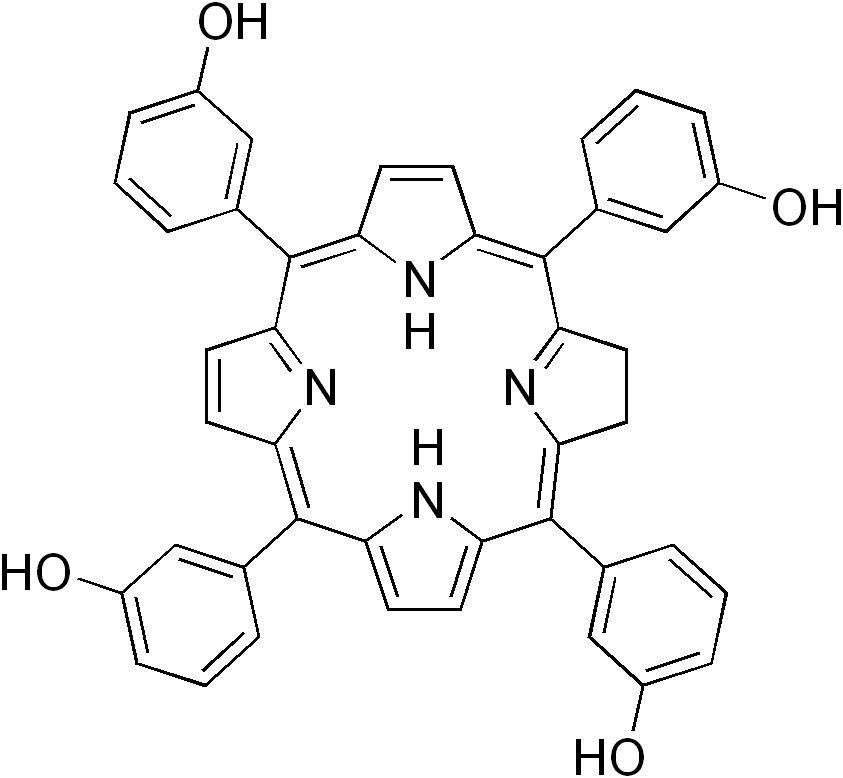

Clinical data
- AHFS/Drugs.com: International Drug Names
- License data: EU EMA: by INN
- ATC code: L01XD05 (WHO)

Legal status
- Legal status: In general: ℞ (Prescription only)

Identifiers
- IUPAC name: 3,3',3'',3'''-(2,3-dihydroporphyrin-5,10,15,20-tetrayl)tetraphenol
- CAS Number: 122341-38-2
- PubChem CID: 60751
- ChemSpider: 54754
- UNII: FU21S769PF
- KEGG: D06066
- ChEMBL: ChEMBL383675
- CompTox Dashboard (EPA): DTXSID7048619
- ECHA InfoCard: 100.152.970

Chemical and physical data
- Formula: C_{44}H_{32}N_{4}O_{4}
- Molar mass: 680.764 g·mol^{−1}
- 3D model (JSmol): Interactive image
- SMILES: C1CC2=NC1=C(C3=CC=C(N3)C(=C4C=CC(=N4)C(=C5C=CC(=C2C6=CC(=CC=C6)O)N5)C7=CC(=CC=C7)O)C8=CC(=CC=C8)O)C9=CC(=CC=C9)O
- InChI: InChI=1S/C44H32N4O4/c49-29-9-1-5-25(21-29)41-33-13-15-35(45-33)42(26-6-2-10-30(50)22-26)37-17-19-39(47-37)44(28-8-4-12-32(52)24-28)40-20-18-38(48-40)43(36-16-14-34(41)46-36)27-7-3-11-31(51)23-27/h1-17,19,21-24,46-47,49-52H,18,20H2/b41-33-,41-34-,42-35-,42-37-,43-36-,43-38-,44-39-,44-40-; Key:LYPFDBRUNKHDGX-LWQDQPMZSA-N

Temoporfin (INN) is a photosensitizer (based on chlorin) used in photodynamic therapy for the treatment of squamous cell carcinoma of the head and neck. It is marketed in the European Union under the brand name Foscan. The U.S. Food and Drug Administration (FDA) declined to approve Foscan in 2000. The EU approved its use in June 2001.

Good results were obtained in 21 of 35 patients treated in Germany.

It is photoactivated at 652 nm by red light.

Patients can remain photosensitive for several weeks after treatment.
