= Antimicrobial photodynamic therapy =

Photochemical antimicrobial technology

Antimicrobial photodynamic therapy (aPDT), also referred to as photodynamic inactivation (PDI), photodisinfection (PD), or photodynamic antimicrobial chemotherapy (PACT), is a photochemical antimicrobial method that has been studied for over a century. Supported by in vitro, in vivo and clinical studies, aPDT offers a treatment option for broad-spectrum infections, particularly in the context of rising antimicrobial resistance. Its multi-target mode of action allows aPDT to be a viable therapeutic strategy against drug-resistant microorganisms. The procedure involves the application of photosensitizing compounds, also called photoantimicrobials, which, upon activation by light, generate reactive oxygen species (ROS). These ROS lead to the oxidation of cellular components of a wide array of microbes, including pathogenic bacteria, fungi, protozoa, algae, and viruses.

== Historical perspective ==
In the early 20th century, decades before the first chemical antibiotics were developed, Dr. Niels Finsen discovered that blue light could be used to treat skin infections. In the following years, Finsen's phototherapy was used in many European medical institutions as a topical antimicrobial. In 1903, the Nobel Prize committee awarded him for his work in Physiology/Medicine, "in recognition of his contribution to the treatment of diseases, especially lupus vulgaris, with concentrated light radiation, whereby he has opened a new avenue for medical science".

Similarly, in the beginning of the 20th century, Oscar Raab, a German medical student supervised by Professor Herman Von Tappeiner, accidentally made a scientific observation of the antimicrobial effects of light-activated dyes. While conducting experiments on the viability of motile protozoa, Raab noticed that fluorescent dyes, like some acridine and xanthene dyes, could kill stained microbes when sunlight was directed onto the stained samples. These effects were particularly pronounced during the summer, when sunlight is brightest. This chance observation highlighted the ability of certain fluorescent compounds, now termed "photosensitizers" (PS), to artificially induce light sensitivity in microorganisms and enhance the known antimicrobial effects of sunlight. Shortly thereafter, Von Tappeiner and Jodlbauer discovered that oxygen was crucial for light-mediated reactions, leading to the creation of the term "photodynamische wirkung" (photodynamic effect).

However, it wasn't until the 1970s that researchers began to systematically explore the potential of photodynamic therapy for medical applications. Since then, significant progress has been made in understanding the underlying mechanisms and optimizing the efficacy of photodynamic therapy (PDT) for treatment of cancers and age-related macular degeneration. Today, the branch of PDT focused on killing microbial cells is considered as an option to prevent and treat infectious diseases in a manner that avoids the emergence of antimicrobial drug-resistance.

== Mechanism of action ==
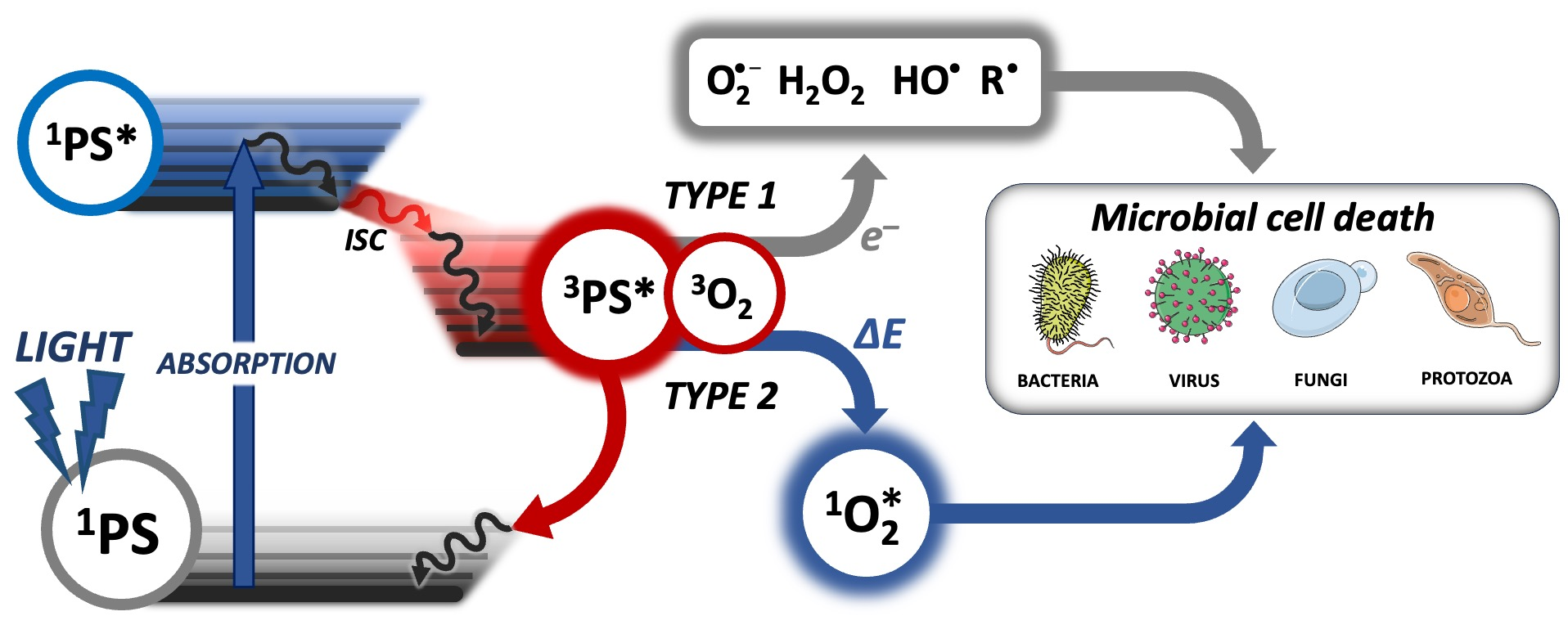
Illustrative scheme of photodynamic reactions. The photosensitizer absorbs light and is promoted from its ground singlet state (^{1}PS) to an excited singlet state (^{1}PS*). Alternatively, the photosensitizer can convert to an excited triplet state (^{3}PS*) by intersystem crossing. This is a longer-living state that allow sufficient time for chemical reactions to occur. A photosensitizer in ^{3}PS* state can return to ground state (^{1}PS) either by emitting phosphorescence, or by photochemical reactions that occur through transfer of charges or energy. These photochemical reactions can locally generate cytotoxic reactive oxygen species (ROS) via the Type I or II photodynamic reactions. In a cellular microenvironment, these ROS have a short lifespan (<10μs), and react with and destroy biomolecules, such as proteins, carbohydrates, nucleic acids, and lipids, very close (<1μm) to the production site. Type I: Charges, such as electrons, are transferred to surrounding substrates (R), forming radicals (R^{•}) due to the presence of the unpaired electron that was received. Molecular oxygen (O_{2}) participates directly or indirectly in this reaction pathway forming the radical anion known as superoxide (O_{2}^{•–}). The superoxide radical can be further reduced to form hydrogen peroxide (H_{2}O_{2}), which can also be reduced to form highly reactive free hydroxyl radicals (HO^{•}) via Fenton-like reactions. Type II: Energy is transferred to ground state triplet molecular oxygen (^{3}O_{2}), creating singlet oxygen (^{1}O_{2}*), an excited form of oxygen that is much more reactive than its ground state triplet counterpart. ^{1}PS = Ground Singlet State of Photosensitizer; ^{1}PS* = First Excited Singlet State of Photosensitizer; ^{3}PS* = First Excited Triplet State of Photosensitizer; ISC = Intersystem Crossing; ^{3}O_{2} = Ground State Triplet Oxygen; ^{1}O_{2} = Excited State Singlet Oxygen.

The photochemical principle underlying antimicrobial photodynamic therapy involves the activation of a photosensitizer, a light-sensitive compound that can locally generate reactive products, such as radicals and reactive oxygen species (ROS), upon exposure to specific wavelengths of light. An ideal photosensitizer selectively accumulates in the target microbial cells, where it remains inactive and non-toxic until it is activated by irradiation with light of a specific wavelength. This activation promotes the photosensitizer molecules to a short-lived excited state that possesses different chemical reactivity relative to its ground-state counterpart. When the photosensitizer molecule is in an excited triplet state, it can induce local Type 1 photodynamic reactions by direct contact with molecular oxygen, inorganic ions or biological targets. These redox reactions (Type 1) involve charge transfers, by donation of electron (e^{–}) or Hydrogen ion (H^{+}), to form radicals and ROS, such as anion radical superoxide, hydrogen peroxide and hydroxyl radicals. The excited triplet-state photosensitizer can also transfer energy to molecular triplet-state oxygen producing singlet oxygen via Type 2 photodynamic reactions. The photoinduced burst of active reactants affect cellular redox regulations and can cause oxidative damage to vital structures made of proteins, lipids, carbohydrates and nucleic acids, leading to localized cellular death.

== Efficacy against drug-resistant pathogens ==
The efficacy of antimicrobial photodynamic therapy, using various distinct photosensitizers, has been studied since the 1990s. Most studies have yielded positive outcomes, often achieving disinfection levels, as defined by infection control guidelines, exceeding 5 log_{10} (99.999%) of microbial inactivation. Over the past decade, a collection of novel photoantimicrobials has been developed, exhibiting improved efficiencies in antimicrobial photodynamic action against various bacterial species. These studies have primarily focused on the inactivation of planktonic cultures, which are free-floating bacterial cells. This method serves as a convenient approach for high-throughput antimicrobial screening of multiple compounds, such as evaluating whether minor chemical modifications to a given photosensitizer can enhance antimicrobial efficacy. However, when present in biofilms, microbial populations can exhibit distinct characteristics compared to their planktonic counterparts, including significantly higher tolerance towards antimicrobials (up to 1,000-fold). Among the various factors contributing to this enhanced tolerance is the biofilm matrix composed extracellular polymeric substance (EPS). The EPS can shield constituent bacteria from antimicrobials through dual mechanisms: 1) by impeding the penetration of antimicrobial substances throughout the biofilm due to interactions between positively charged agents and negatively charged EPS residues, and also by 2) redox processes and π-π interactions involving aromatic surfaces generally acting to dismute the incoming active substance. EPS must be considered in the rational design of antimicrobial photosensitizers, because the densely cross linked matrix may also obstruct diffusion of photosensitizer into deeper biofilm layers.

The multi-target mechanisms of aPDT avoid antimicrobial resistance, which continues to be a major global health concern. The likelihood of developing resistance in pathogens is higher for antimicrobial strategies that have a specific target structure, following the key-lock principle, embodied in many antibiotics or antiseptics. In such cases, pathogens can evade the antimicrobial challenge through specific mutations, upregulation of efflux pumps, or production of enzymes that deactivate antimicrobials. In contrast, aPDT acts through a variety of non-specific oxidative mechanisms targeting multiple structures and pathways simultaneously, making the technique far less prone to resistance. The possibility of bacteria developing tolerance to aPDT has therefore been deemed highly unlikely. Several studies have demonstrated the efficacy of aPDT against various drug-resistant pathogens, including the World Health Organization (WHO) priority pathogens, such as Staphylococcus aureus, Pseudomonas aeruginosa, Klebsiella pneumoniae, Acinetobacter baumannii, Enterococcus faecium, Candida auris, Escherichia coli and many others.

== Light sources ==
Light is required to excite the photosensitizer, which leads to the photochemical production of ROS. To efficiently transfer photon energy to the electron structure of the photosensitizer, the wavelength of the light source must be matched to the absorption spectrum of the photosensitizer. Different light sources have been used in aPDT, such as lamps (e.g. tungsten filament, Xenon arc and fluorescent lamps), lasers and light emitting diodes (LEDs). Lamps typically emit white light, but a filter can be used to select the appropriate wavelength to be absorbed by the photosensitizer and to avoid undesired thermal effects. In contrast, lasers are monochromatic light sources that can be easily coupled to optical fibers to access non-surface regions. LEDs are also monochromatic light sources, although their spectral emission bands are wider than those of lasers. However, the coupling of LEDs and optical fibers is not efficient, resulting in significant loss of light. More recently, organic LEDs (OLEDs) have been used in aPDT as wearable light sources because they can be made to be more flexible, thinner, and lighter than conventional LEDs. Sunlight can also serve as a source of light for aPDT; however, exact illumination parameters may be difficult to precisely reproduce.

== Light dosimetry ==
aPDT results depend on the interplay of three physical quantities: irradiance, radiant exposure and exposure time. Irradiance is defined as the optical power of the light source in Watts, divided by the area of tissue illumination conventionally described in square meters or centimeters (W/m^{2} or W/cm^{2}). The irradiance, as a photodynamic parameter, is limited by the onset of adverse thermal factors in exposed tissue, or by degradative consequences to the sensitizer itself (commonly referred to as "photobleaching"). Radiant exposure is given by the product of irradiance and exposure time in seconds, divided by the illuminated area (J/cm^{2}), and is commonly termed the light dose. This parameter is often limited by acceptable treatment times because lengthy treatment times can be unacceptable in a point-of-care setting. Fluence is a different physical quantity often used by aPDT practitioners, which considers the backscattering flux of light-tissue interaction causing re-entry of photons back into the treated area.

== Photosensitizers ==
Photodynamic action relies on absorption of electromagnetic radiation by the photosensitizing compound and conversion of this energy into redox chemical reactions or transfer to ground-state oxygen, producing the highly oxidizing species, singlet oxygen. Consequently, the photosensitizer can be considered a photocatalyst, but it is also true that the sensitizer directly interacts with target moieties such as microbes to establish, for example, molecular targeting. This explains why not all photosensitizers are useful as photoantimicrobials.

The most effective photosensitizer molecules carry a positive charge (cationic). This promotes electrostatic attraction with negatively charged groups found on microbial cell surfaces (e.g. phosphate, carboxylate, sulfate), thus ensuring that during illumination, production of reactive oxygen species occurs in close contact with the targeted cellular population. Consequently, negatively charged photosensitizers are less effective, particularly against gram-negative bacterial cells that carry a strongly negative zeta potential.

The most widely employed photosensitizer in clinical practice is the phenothiazine derivative, methylene blue, which carries a +1 charge. Methylene blue is also favored due to its long record of safe use in patients, both in surgical staining and the systemic treatment of methemoglobinemia. Many other photosensitizers have been suggested, from various chemical classes, such as porphyrins, phthalocyanines and xanthenes, but the requirement for cationic nature and proven safety for human/animal use represents a high barrier to new chemical entity development.

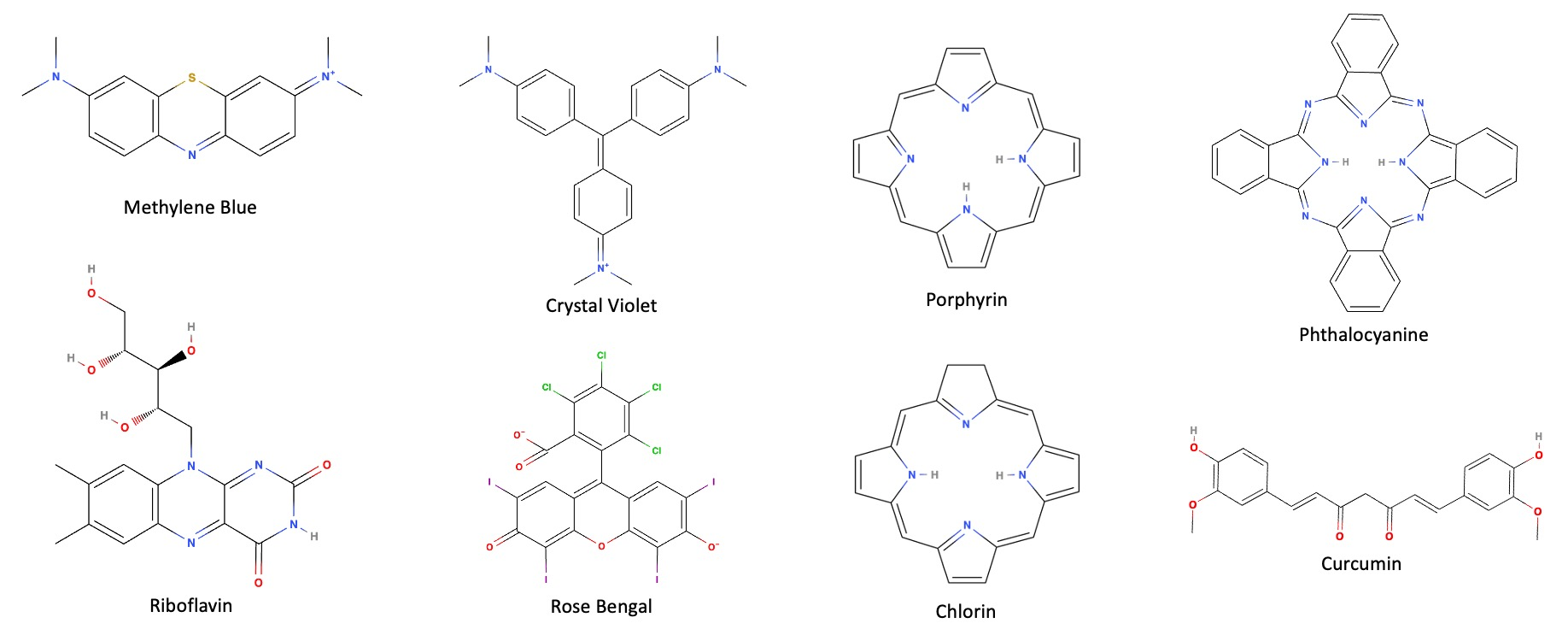
Molecular frameworks most often used as photosensitizers for antimicrobial photodynamic therapy. The examples listed in this figure include: methylene blue (MB, phenothiazine), crystal violet (CV, triarylmethane), porphyrins, phtalocyanines, riboflavin (Vitamin B_{2}), rose bengal (RB, halogenated xanthene), chlorins and curcumin.

== aPDT Enhancement by inorganic salts and gold nanoparticles ==
It was discovered in 2015 that the addition of inorganic salts can potentiate aPDT by several orders of magnitude, and may even allow oxygen-independent photoinactivation to take place. Potassium iodide (KI) is the most relevant example. Other inorganic salts such as potassium thiocyanate (KSCN), potassium selenocyanate (KSeCN), potassium bromide (KBr), sodium nitrite (NaNO_{2}) and even sodium azide (NaN_{3}, toxic) have also been shown to increase the killing of a broad range of pathogens by up to one million times.

The addition of KI at concentrations up to 100 mM allows gram-negative bacteria to be killed by photosensitizers, which have no effect on their own, and this was shown to be effective in several animal models of localized infections. KI was shown to be effective in human AIDS patients with oral candidiasis who were treated with methylene blue aPDT. Oral consumption of saturated KI solution (4-6 g KI/day) is a standard treatment for some deep fungal infections of the skin.

The photochemical mechanisms of action are complex. KI can react with singlet oxygen to form free molecular iodine plus hydrogen peroxide, which show synergistic and long-lived antimicrobial effects, as well as forming short-lived, reactive iodine radicals. Type 1 photosensitizers can carry out direct electron transfer to form iodine radicals, even in the absence of oxygen. KSCN reacts with singlet oxygen to form sulfur trioxide radicals, while KSeCN forms semi-stable selenocyanogen. KBr reacts with TiO_{2} photocatalysis to form hypobromite, while NaNO_{2} reacts with singlet oxygen to form unstable peroxynitrate. NaN_{3} quenches singlet oxygen so it can only react by electron transfer to form azide radicals. Relatively high concentrations of salts are necessary to trap the short-lived reactive species produced during aPDT.

The presence of gold nanoparticles is able to enhance the antimicrobial effectiveness of photosensitizers such as toludine blue. Covalently linking nanoparticles to a photosensitizer also results in enhanced antimicrobial activity. The gold nanoparticles have two roles: firstly they enhance the light capture of the dye and secondly they help direct the decay pathway for the dye, encouraging a non-radiative process through the formation of excess bactericidal radical species.

== Incorporation of photosensitizers into polymers ==
Photosensitizers can be incorporated into polymers resulting in materials that can kill microbes on their surfaces when activated by visible light. Such polymers have been shown to be effective in killing bacteria in a clinical environment. These self-disinfecting materials could, therefore, be used to coat surfaces in order to reduce the spread of disease-causing microbes in clinical environments as well as in food-processing and food-handling premises.

Advances in medicine and surgery have led to increasing reliance on a variety of medical devices of which the catheter is the most widely used. Unfortunately, the non-shedding surfaces of catheters can be colonized by microbes resulting in biofilm formation and, consequently, lead to an infection. Such catheter-related infections are a major cause of morbidity and mortality. Photosensitizers such as methylene blue and toluidine blue have been incorporated into silicone, the main polymer used in the manufacture of catheters, and the resulting composites have been shown to exert an antimicrobial effect when exposed to light of a suitable wavelength. Suitable irradiation of such materials has been shown to be able to significantly reduce biofilm accumulation on their surfaces. This approach has potential for reducing the morbidity and mortality associated with catheter-associated infections.

== Microbial resistance to aPDT ==
The generation of reactive oxygen species (ROS) in neutrophils, macrophages, and eosinophils is one of the primary means by which the human immune system combats infecting microbes. Highly adaptable microbes have evolved some level of protection strategies against these reactive molecules by upregulating antioxidant enzymes when exposed to ROS, suggesting one method by which microbes could develop increased resistance to aPDT. However, these biochemical responses are limited when compared to the magnitude of oxidative stress placed on the microbe by aPDT. Numerous investigations involving the repeated exposure of microorganisms to sublethal doses of antimicrobial photodynamic therapy (aPDT) and the subsequent analysis of the resilience of the cultured cells that survive, consistently reveal no significant indication of the development of resistance in these microorganisms. In fact, a study using methylene blue as a photosensitizer (PS) against MRSA, a series of aPDT exposure followed by re-cultivation tests conducted over multiple years showed that the microorganism's sensitivity to aPDT remained unchanged. In contrast, significant resistance to oxacillin emerged in fewer than twelve cycles.

== Virulence inhibition by aPDT ==
Pathogenic microbes cause harm to their hosts and evade host defense mechanisms through a range of virulence factors, which include elements like exotoxins, endotoxins, capsules, adhesins, invasins, and proteases. While antibiotics can inactivate microbes and thereby prevent further production of host-damaging virulence factors, few have any effect on pre-existing virulence factors or those which are released during the bactericidal process. These factors can continue to produce damaging effects even after the offending microbial cells have been inactivated.

Unlike most antimicrobial drugs, antimicrobial photodynamic therapy (aPDT) is typically capable of neutralizing or diminishing the effectiveness of microbial virulence factors, or it can reduce their expression. The ability to inhibit microbial virulence is of particular interest because it could be related to accelerated infection site healing when compared to standard antimicrobial chemotherapy that only relies on bacteriostatic or bactericidal effects. Secreted virulence factors normally contain peptides, and it is well known that some amino acids (e.g. histidine, cysteine, tyrosine, tryptophan and methionine) are highly vulnerable to oxidation. Photodynamic reactions have demonstrated significant effectiveness in diminishing the harmful activity of lipopolysaccharides (LPS), proteases, and various other microbial toxins. The capability to not only eliminate the microbes causing an infection but also to inhibit expression of various molecules that lead to host tissue damage offers a significant benefit over traditional antimicrobial drugs.

== Nasal decolonization ==
Nasal decolonization is recognized as a primary preventive intervention in the development of hospital-acquired infections (HAIs), especially surgical site infections (SSIs). HAIs represent a serious public health concern worldwide, with approximately 2.5 million HAIs annually in the United States leading to high morbidity and mortality (e.g. 30,000 deaths per year directly attributable to HAIs). HAIs affect one in every 31 hospitalized patients in the USA. Staphylococcus aureus, a gram-positive bacterium, is the most common cause of nosocomial pneumonia and surgical site infections and the second-most common cause of bloodstream, cardiovascular, and eye, ear, nose, and throat infections. S. aureus is by far the leading cause of skin and soft tissue HAIs, which can lead to potentially lethal bacteremia. SSIs are among the most common healthcare-associated infections with substantial morbidity and mortality. An analysis of the 2005 Nationwide Inpatient Sample Database showed that S. aureus infections in inpatients tripled the duration of hospital stay, increasing length of stay by an average of 7.5 days for surgical site infections. The anterior nares have been classified as the most consistent site of S. aureus colonization. Asymptomatic S. aureus nasal carriage in healthy individuals has been reported at 20-55%, causing increased risk of surgical-site infection by almost 4-fold. Critically, a growing proportion of these bacterial populations exhibit antibiotic resistance.

Nasal decolonization of S. aureus to reduce the incidence of SSIs is expanding into current standard of care in both intensive care units (ICU) and presurgical settings. Various decolonization strategies have been used in hospitals in an effort to reduce transmission of bacteria and decrease overall infection rate. Decolonization effects are both directly and indirectly related via reduction of the overall bioburden when broadly administered within an acute care setting. There is the added benefit of effects that go beyond the treated patients extending to healthcare workers and other patients.

Several clinical studies performed using the current standard of care – intranasal mupirocin 2% antibiotic ointment – in surgical patients, concluded that this treatment significantly decreased the rate of hospital-acquired infections. One study found a 44% reduction in bloodstream infection rates when universal decolonization was used (e.g. intranasal mupirocin ointment and chlorhexidine body wash) in a trial involving 73,256 hospital patients. In addition, researchers have demonstrated that eradicating S. aureus from the anterior nares also utilizing intranasal mupirocin ointment reduced surgical site infection rates up to 58% in hospitalized patients who were nasal carriers. However, widespread use of mupirocin is associated with development of mupirocin-resistant strains of MRSA, with one hospital in Canada experiencing an increase from 2.7% to 65% resistant strains in three years. A targeted – as opposed to universal – decolonization approach is sometimes recommended because of increasing levels of mupirocin resistance. Currently, only universal decolonization with mupirocin has been demonstrated to be an effective control measure and therefore selective administration of mupirocin is contraindicated.

Nasal aPDT addresses the issues of antibiotic-induced resistance in multiple ways. As a site-specific therapy, it does not interfere with the overall microbiome because it is not systemically administered. Moreover, phenothiazinium photosensitizers can target negatively charged bacterial cells leaving zwitterionic host tissues unharmed. Treatment of the nose specifically targets the respiratory outlet, which is a key source of microbial colonization and dissemination through touch or normal respiration. Yet, the unspecific mechanisms of action effectively prevent development of resistance.

The first large-scale study involving aPDT for nasal decolonization, initially conducted exclusively on specific surgery types, the study demonstrated a significant 42% reduction in surgical site infections. The most significant reduction in SSI rates were in orthopedic and spinal surgeries. Currently, the use of nasal photodisinfection has been expanded to encompass a wide range of surgeries, resulting in an increased effect size with an approximate efficacy of 80%. The technique has been deployed in multiple Canadian hospitals since that time, and is undergoing clinical trials in the US for the same purpose.

Specialty-specific studies have also been carried out, especially in high-risk surgery of the spine. One large Canadian study found that the spine-surgery SSI rate decreased 5.6% (from 7.2% to 1.6%) because of nasal aPDT combined with chlorhexidine bathing, saving on average $45–55 CAD per treated patient ($4.24 million CAD annually). This study concluded that "CSD/nPDT is both efficacious and cost-effective in preventing surgical site infections". No adverse events were reported.

== Skin infections ==
There are three main types of skin infections in humans that have been treated with aPDT: 1) Fungal infections, 2) Mycobacterial infections and 3) Cutaneous Leishmaniasis. The most clinically used photosensitizers are methylene blue and curcumin, as well as the protoporphyrin IX precursors, aminolevulinic acid (ALA) and methyl-ALA.

Fungal infections treated with aPDT have included both Dermatophytosis and Sporotrichosis. Infections with filamentous fungi such as Trichophyton spp. which express keratinase enzymes usually affect the toenails (onychomycosis), but can also affect the skin (tinea). In onychomycosis (tinea unguium), efforts are often made to increase the penetration of photosensitizers into the toenail matrix before the application of light. Cutaneous tinea infections affecting the foot, scalp or crotch have been treated with ALA-aPDT. Sporotrichosis is a zoonosis caused by the dimorphic fungus Sporothrix spp often transmitted by animal bites or scratches. It has been treated with aPDT mediated by ALA or methylene blue.

Skin infections can be caused by non-tuberculous mycobacteria, including rapidly growing species such as Mycobacterium marinum (swimmers' granuloma) and Mycobacterium avium complex. Some of these infections have been treated with aPDT using ALA in combination with conventional antibiotics.

Leishmaniasis is caused by an intracellular parasitic infection caused by single-celled protozoa of the genus Leishmania. It is transmitted by the bites of infected sand flies found in both the Old World (Southern Europe and Middle East) and the New World (Central and South America). Each year there are up to 2 million new cases and 70,000 deaths worldwide. Leishmaniasis infections can be either cutaneous, mucosal, or visceral, with the latter type being the deadliest. Cutaneous leishmaniasis has been treated with aPDT mediated by either ALA or methylene blue, because the standard treatment using systemic amphotericin B or topical pentavalent antimonial preparations have several drawbacks.

== Chronic wounds ==
Chronic wounds are those that do not heal within months of treatment. They are classified into three main types, i.e. venous, diabetic, and pressure ulcers and are frequently sites of microbial infection that become a major deterrent to for patient recovery. aPDT offers a treatment option for chronic wounds, because of its lethal action against drug-resistant microorganisms.

Diabetic Foot ulcers (DFU) affect 10 to 25% of diabetic patients during their lives, requiring long and intensive hospitalization. The economic impact of DFU to worldwide health care systems is significant. DFU are frequently infected with a combination of fungi and bacteria including the genera Serratia, Morganella, Proteus, Haemophilus, Acinetobacter, Enterococcus, and Staphylococcus. In addition, there is an increased likelihood of contracting resistant strains of these and other microorganisms from hospital settings. DFU patients commonly respond poorly to antibiotic therapy. Consequently, amputation becomes indicated to prevent other complications, such as osteonecrosis, thrombosis and more disseminated types of bacteremia.

aPDT has been successfully used to treat the diabetic foot, reducing the incidence of amputation in DFU patients. DFU patients treated with aPDT were associated with only a 2.9% chance of amputation, compared to 100% in the control group (classical antibiotic therapy, without aPDT). Using an initial cohort study of 62 patients and subsequently of 218 patients, Tardivo and colleagues developed the Tardivo algorithm as a prognostic score to determine the risk of amputation and to predict the ideal therapeutic options for the treatment of DFU by aPDT. The score is based on three factors: Wagner's classification, signs of PAD, and location of foot ulcers. Values for the independent parameters are multiplied together and, for patients with scores below 16, treatment with aPDT is associated with approximately 85% (95% CI) chance of recovery.

== Oral infections ==
In the early 90s, Emeritus Professor Michael Wilson from University College London (UCL), initiated scientific investigations on the potential of aPDT to combat bacteria of interest in dentistry. Since then, aPDT has been explored for various oral conditions, such as periodontal disease (gum disease), dental caries (cavities), endodontic treatment (root canal treatment), oral herpes and oral candidiasis. Research and clinical studies have shown promising results in reducing microbial load and treating infections. However, the efficacy of aPDT can vary based on factors like the type and concentration of photosensitizer used, light parameters, and the specific infection being treated.

While aPDT can be considered as an adjunctive treatment to standard of care, it is not currently intended to replace conventional therapies. This may change in the future, as drug-resistance patterns in the oral microbiome develop over time, making aPDT monotherapy increasingly necessary.

Some advantages of aPDT in oral infections include broad-spectrum action since aPDT can target a wide range of microorganisms (e.g. bacteria, fungi, and virus), including antibiotic-resistant strains, and oral biofilm is composed of wide variety of microorganisms. Another advantage is the localized treatment that can be used to target specific infected areas, minimizing damage to healthy tissues, and maintaining the normal microbiota without significant damage. To date, no significant adverse events associated with intraoral aPDT have been reported.

aPDT offers the dental practitioner an intraoral decontamination therapy that its minimally invasive nature, broad-spectrum action, rapid microbicidal effect, reduced antibiotic use, patient comfort factor, high compliance rate, treatment of resistant strains and minimization of microbial resistance selection.

== Disinfection of blood-products ==
During the 1980s, the realization of the presence of the human immunodeficiency virus (HIV) in the global supply of donated blood led to the development of both thorough hemovigilance and of methods for the safe disinfection of microbial species in donated blood and blood products.

Blood is a mixture of cells and proteins and is routinely separated into its constituent parts for use in various therapies, e.g. platelets, red cells and plasma might be used in specific replacement, and proteins (typically clotting factors) derived from the plasma fraction are provided for the treatment of hemophilia, for example. Viruses, such as HIV, might be associated with the cellular components or suspended extracellularly, thus representing a threat of recipient infection whichever of these fractions is used. However, treatments aimed at viral inactivation/destruction must preserve cell/protein function, and this represents a barrier, particularly to cellular disinfection.

In terms of the use of photosensitizers, both methylene blue and riboflavin are employed for the photodisinfection of plasma, using visible or long-wave ultraviolet illumination respectively, while riboflavin is also used for disinfection of platelets. However, neither approach is employed for red blood cell concentrates (packed RBC). Among related approaches, the psoralen derivative Amotosalen, activated by long-wavelength UV light, is used in Europe for disinfection of plasma and platelets. However, this represents a photochemical reaction between the psoralen nucleus and viral nucleic acids, rather than a purely photodynamic effect. Disinfection of packed RBC and whole blood is still being developed and might not necessarily involve light activation.

A proposed use of blood disinfection is in the treatment of sepsis, where the patient's blood is disinfected and infused back.

== Veterinary applications ==
In small animal practice, aPDT has been investigated for the treatment of different dermatological diseases with positive results. Although there are limited scientific data in this field, successful applications include otitis externa caused by multidrug-resistant Pseudomonas aeruginosa, dermatophytosis caused by Microsporum canis, and in association with itraconazole for sporotrichosis.

aPDT can also be used as a non-antibiotic platform for the treatment of infectious diseases in food-producing animals. Indeed, overuse of antimicrobials in these animals may lead to contamination of meat and milk by antibiotic-resistant bacteria or antibiotic residues. In this regard, aPDT has proven effective in the treatment of caseous lymphadenitis and streptococcal abscesses in sheep, and is demonstrably more effective than oxytetracycline (gold standard treatment) for bovine digital dermatitis. Other applications of aPDT include the treatment of mastitis in dairy cattle and sheep, and sole ulcers and surgical wound healing in cattle.

Exotic, zoo, and wildlife medicine is challenging and stands out as another field of possibility for aPDT. In this regard, aPDT has been successfully used to treat penguins suffering from pododermatitis and snakes with infectious stomatitis caused by gram-negative bacteria. Additionally, aPDT has been deployed as an adjuvant endodontic treatment for a traumatic tusk fracture in an elephant.

== Food decontamination ==
The ever-increasing demand for food decontamination technologies has resulted in several studies focusing on the evaluation of the antimicrobial efficacy of aPDT in food and its effect on the organoleptic properties of the food products.

aPDT has shown antimicrobial efficacy against microbes on fruits, vegetables, seafood, and meat. The efficacy of aPDT used in this way is dependent on several factors including wavelength of light, temperature, and food-related factors such as acidity, surface properties and water activity. Endogenous porphyrins that are light-absorbing compounds located within certain bacteria produce photosensitized reactions in the presence of light in the blue region of the spectrum (400-500 nm), showing better antimicrobial efficacy than other wavelengths in the visible spectrum (e.g. green and red, 500-700 nm) in the absence of an exogenous photosensitizer.

Acidity of the food being disinfected plays an important role, as gram-positive bacteria have been found to be more sensitive to aPDT in acidic conditions while gram-negative bacteria are more sensitive to aPDT at alkaline conditions. Since aPDT is a surface decontamination technology, the surface characteristics of the tested material play an important role. The irregular surfaces of products like pet food pellets can lead to a shadowing effect, where microorganisms can hide in food crevices and be shielded from the light treatment. Flat surfaces can show better efficacy of aPDT as compared to the spherical or irregular surfaces. Moreover, high water activity conditions contribute to the success of aPDT compared to low water activity conditions, due to limited penetration of light in more desiccated foods. Other factors like irradiance, treatment time (or dose), microbial strain, and distance of the product from the light source also play a major role in the microbicidal efficacy of food-based aPDT.

A recent study demonstrated that appropriate concentrations of a photosensitizer potentially useful for food-based disinfection combined with appropriate peak absorption wavelength light resulted in upwards of 99.999% (5 log_{10}) reduction in MRSA and complete kill in Salmonella cell counts. In addition to bacteria, aPDT has shown efficacy against fungal species. Optimization of the factors influencing antimicrobial efficacy and scalability of aPDT are required for successful application in the food industry.
