= Amphinex =

Agent used in treating cancer

Amphinex is a photosensitising agent used in photodynamic therapy for treating superficial cancers.

It has had promising preliminary results in early trials on patients with advanced head and neck cancer
