= Photosens =

Photosens is a mixture of sulfonated aluminium phthalocyanines with various degrees of sulfonation. Developed in Russia.

It is a photosensitiser (activated by 675 nm red light) sometimes used in photodynamic therapy trials.

It has been tried on Age-related macular degeneration
