= 2-(1-Hexyloxyethyl)-2-devinyl pyropheophorbide-a =

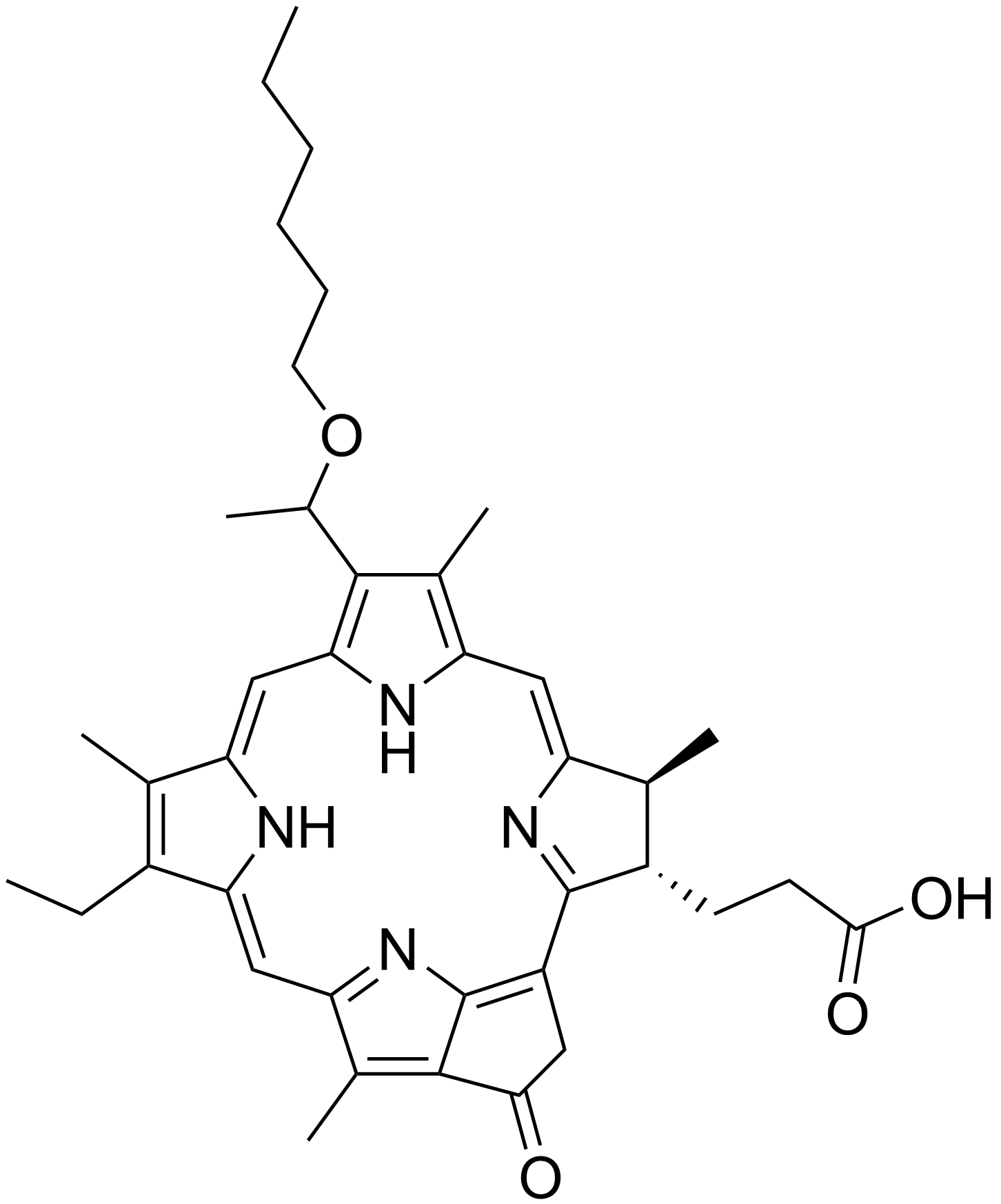

Names
- Other names Photochlor

Identifiers
CAS Number	149402-51-7
3D model (JSmol)	Interactive image
Abbreviations	HPPH
ChemSpider	4589621
PubChem CID	5488034
UNII	DOB7Y3RSX0
- InChI: InChI=1S/C39H48N4O4/c1-8-10-11-12-15-47-24(7)36-22(5)30-17-29-21(4)26(13-14-35(45)46)38(42-29)27-16-34(44)37-23(6)31(43-39(27)37)18-32-25(9-2)20(3)28(40-32)19-33(36)41-30/h17-19,21,24,26,40-41H,8-16H2,1-7H3,(H,45,46)/b28-19-,29-17-,30-17-,31-18-,32-18-,33-19-,38-27-/t21-,24?,26-/m0/s1 Key: ODJVLHDVEGAIAW-NMWXTPPCSA-N; InChI=1/C39H48N4O4/c1-8-10-11-12-15-47-24(7)36-22(5)30-17-29-21(4)26(13-14-35(45)46)38(42-29)27-16-34(44)37-23(6)31(43-39(27)37)18-32-25(9-2)20(3)28(40-32)19-33(36)41-30/h17-19,21,24,26,40-41H,8-16H2,1-7H3,(H,45,46)/b28-19-,29-17-,30-17-,31-18-,32-18-,33-19-,38-27-/t21-,24?,26-/m0/s1 Key: ODJVLHDVEGAIAW-NMWXTPPCBI
- SMILES: CCCCCCOC(C)C1=C2C=C3C(=C(C(=CC4=NC5=C(CC(=O)C5=C4C)C6=NC(=CC(=C1C)N2)[C@H]([C@@H]6CCC(=O)O)C)N3)CC)C

Properties
Chemical formula	C_{39}H_{48}N_{4}O_{4}
Molar mass	636.837 g·mol^{−1}
- Except where otherwise noted, data are given for materials in their standard state (at 25 °C [77 °F], 100 kPa). verify (what is ?) Infobox references

2-(1-Hexyloxyethyl)-2-devinyl pyropheophorbide-a (HPPH) is a photosensitiser chemical that is used in photodynamic therapy.

It is being developed under the brand name Photochlor.

== Clinical trials ==
A phase I/II clinical trial started in 1997 for esophageal cancer.

A phase II trial for non-small cell lung cancer is due to run from 2007 to 2011.
