= Nanodumbbell =

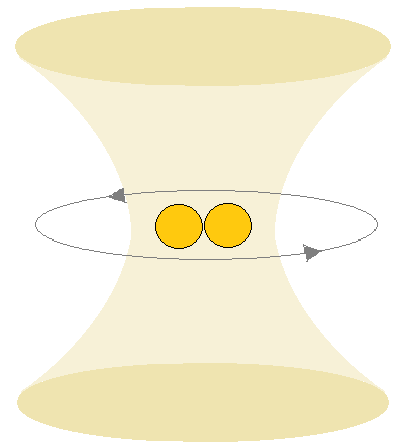
Illustration of nanodumbbells spinning in a vacuum

A nanodumbell is a pair of spheres attached together that may be made of silica or zinc oxide.

They have been used in a Purdue University experiment where they were made to spin in a vacuum at 60 billion rotations per minute.

== Description ==
The nanodumbbells are first created in the lab using a hydro-thermal process. The resulting dumbbell consists of two joined silica spheres, making it 320 nanometers long and around 170 nanometers wide in size.

Nanodumbbells are also being studied for possible use in photodynamic therapy, a way of treating cancer.

== Experiment ==
Highly focused circularly polarized light laser light bombards the levitated dumbbell to set it spinning.

== Previous records ==
The speed of the rotation is a world record that beats previous records. In 2008, a small motor rotated at 1 million rotations per minute. In 2010, a slice of graphene was made to spin at 60 million spins per minute. Around 2013, a sphere measuring just 4 micrometers was spun at 600 million spins per minute.
