= Photostatin =

Photostatins are inhibitors that can be switched on and off in vivo by visible light, to optically control microtubule dynamics. Photostatins are a form of photopharmacology.

As a cell prepares to divide, its microtubules, arrange themselves into a spindle that permits its chromosomes to split into two bundles. These bundles become the nuclei of the daughter cells, Out-of-control cell replication is the underlying cause of cancer, developing drugs that interfere with microtubule activity offers one potential therapeutic approach. They can operate microtubule dynamics with a subsecond response time and control mitosis in living organisms with single-cell spatial precision.

Most microtubule inhibitors affect both cancerous and healthy cells, requiring lower doses to avoid severe side effects. Because photostatins are inactive in the absence of light, they only affect cells that are illuminated. Focusing light on tumors directs their activities to appropriate targets with fewer side effects.

== Combretastatin A-4 ==
One phostatin is combretastatin A-4, one of several combretastatins found in the bark of the South African bushwillow. It comes in two isomers, that share a single composition, but different shapes. One isomer is a poor disrupter of tubule activity while the other is effective.

Replacing two adjacent carbon atoms in the molecule with nitrogen atoms changes the non-toxic isomer, which does little to disrupt tubules, into the toxic one in the presence of blue light. This transformation is reversed simply by switching the light off. The drug proved 200 times more toxic when exposed to light in this way than in the dark. The effect increased to 250 times under violet light and decreased to 75 times when exposed to cyan.

== See also ==
- Photopharmacology
