= Hexaminolevulinate =

Optical imaging agent

Clinical data
- Trade names: Cysview, Hexvix
- License data: US DailyMed: Hexaminolevulinate
- ATC code: V04CX06 (WHO)

Legal status
- Legal status: AU: S4 (Prescription only); CA: ℞-only; US: ℞-only

Identifiers
- CAS Number: 140898-97-1
- PubChem CID: 6433083
- DrugBank: DB06261
- ChemSpider: 4938272
- UNII: G7H20TKI67
- KEGG: D04436
- ChEBI: CHEBI:134892
- ChEMBL: ChEMBL1201784
- CompTox Dashboard (EPA): DTXSID40161487

Hexaminolevulinate, sold under the brand name Cysview among others, is an imaging agent that lights up under blue light during a blue light cystoscopy. It is used to help detect non-muscle invasive bladder cancer (NMIBC), in particular papillary tumors and carcinoma in situ (CIS).

Hexaminolevulinate is a structural analogue to 5-aminolevulinic acid (a precursor to the porphyrin ring of heme), and is internalized and processed into the photoactive protoporphyrin IX at a high rate by tumor cells. After exposure to 360-450 nm light, the porphyrin will fluoresce red.
