= Hematoporphyrin =

Chemical compound

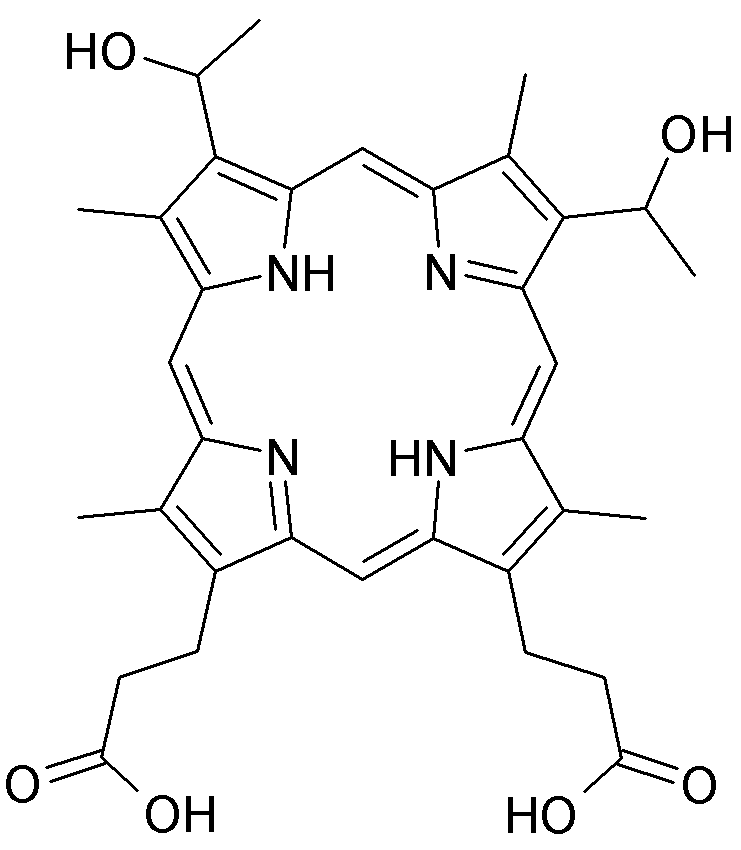

Clinical data
- Routes of administration: Oral
- ATC code: none

Legal status
- Legal status: In general: ℞ (Prescription only)

Identifiers
- IUPAC name: 7,12-bis(1-hydroxyethyl)-3,8,13,17-tetramethyl-21H,23H-porphine-2,18-dipropanoic acid
- CAS Number: 14459-29-1
- PubChem CID: 11103
- ChemSpider: 10632
- UNII: HBT6M5H379
- ChEMBL: ChEMBL317840
- CompTox Dashboard (EPA): DTXSID901030645
- ECHA InfoCard: 100.034.939

Chemical and physical data
- Formula: C_{34}H_{38}N_{4}O_{6}
- Molar mass: 598.700 g·mol^{−1}
- 3D model (JSmol): Interactive image
- Melting point: 172.5 °C (342.5 °F)
- SMILES: CC1=C(C2=CC3=NC(=CC4=NC(=CC5=C(C(=C(N5)C=C1N2)C(C)O)C)C(=C4CCC(=O)O)C)C(=C3C)CCC(=O)O)C(C)O
- InChI: InChI=1S/C34H38N4O6/c1-15-21(7-9-31(41)42)27-14-28-22(8-10-32(43)44)16(2)24(36-28)12-29-34(20(6)40)18(4)26(38-29)13-30-33(19(5)39)17(3)25(37-30)11-23(15)35-27/h11-14,19-20,37-40H,7-10H2,1-6H3,(H,41,42)(H,43,44)/b23-11-,24-12-,25-11-,26-13-,27-14-,28-14-,29-12-,30-13-; Key:KFKRXESVMDBTNQ-AMPAVEGJSA-N

Hematoporphyrin (Photodyn, Sensibion) is a porphyrin prepared from hemin. It is a derivative of protoporphyrin IX, where the two vinyl groups have been hydrated (converted to alcohols). It is a deeply colored solid that is usually encountered as a solution. Its chemical structure was determined in 1900.

It is used as a photosensitizer in photodynamic therapy. Acetylation of hematoporphyrin followed by hydrolysis of the product of that reaction affords a mixture called hematoporphyrin derivative (HPD), which is also used in photodynamic therapy.

Hematoporphyrin has also been used as an antidepressant and antipsychotic since the 1920s.
