= Photosensitizer =

Type of molecule reacting to light

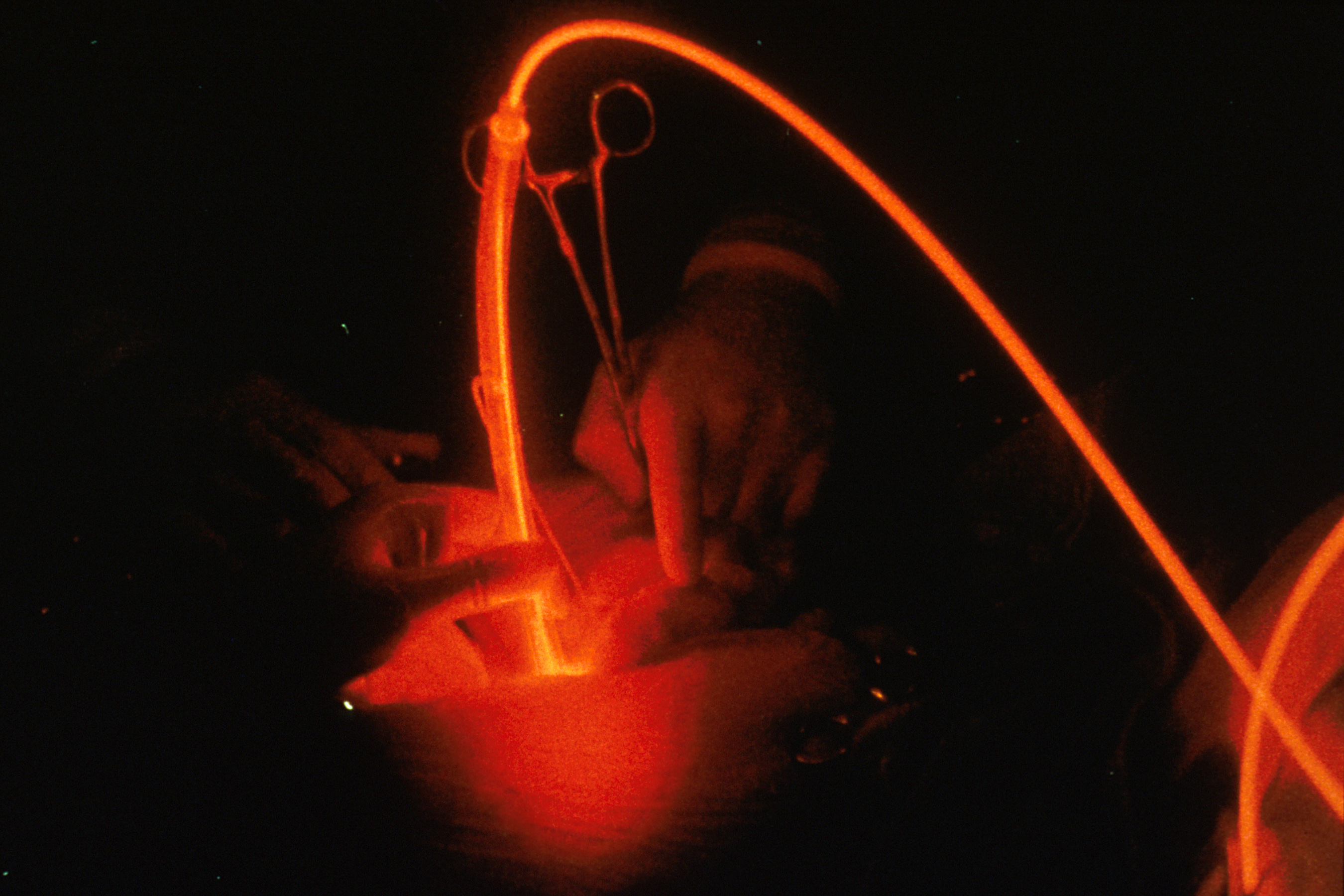
A photosensitizer being used in photodynamic therapy

Photosensitizers are light absorbers that alter the course of a photochemical reaction. They usually are catalysts. They can function by many mechanisms; sometimes they abstract an electron from the substrate, and sometimes they abstract a hydrogen atom from the substrate. At the end of this process, the photosensitizer returns to its ground state, where it remains chemically intact, poised to absorb more light. One branch of chemistry which frequently utilizes photosensitizers is polymer chemistry, using photosensitizers in reactions such as photopolymerization, photocrosslinking, and photodegradation. Photosensitizers are also used to generate prolonged excited electronic states in organic molecules with uses in photocatalysis, photon upconversion and photodynamic therapy. Generally, photosensitizers absorb electromagnetic radiation consisting of infrared radiation, visible light radiation, and ultraviolet radiation and transfer absorbed energy into neighboring molecules. This absorption of light is made possible by photosensitizers' large de-localized π-systems, which lowers the energy of HOMO and LUMO orbitals to promote photoexcitation. While many photosensitizers are organic or organometallic compounds, there are also examples of using semiconductor quantum dots as photosensitizers.

== Theory ==
Basic schematic for all photosensitizers (PS) wherein the photosensitizer absorbs light (hν) and transfers energy to create a physicochemical change

=== Mechanistic considerations ===
Photosensitizers absorb light (hν) and transfer the energy from the incident light into another nearby molecule either directly or by a chemical reaction. Upon absorbing photons of radiation from incident light, photosensitizers transform into an excited singlet state. The single electron in the excited singlet state then flips in its intrinsic spin state via Intersystem crossing to become an excited triplet state. Triplet states typically have longer lifetimes than excited singlets. The prolonged lifetime increases the probability of interacting with other molecules nearby. Photosensitizers experience varying levels of efficiency for intersystem crossing at different wavelengths of light based on the internal electronic structure of the molecule.

=== Parameters ===
For a molecule to be considered a photosensitizer:

- The photosensitizer must impart a physicochemical change upon a substrate after absorbing incident light.
- Upon imparting a chemical change, the photosensitizer returns to its original chemical form.

It is important to differentiate photosensitizers from other photochemical interactions including, but not limited to, photoinitiators, photocatalysts, photoacids and photopolymerization. Photosensitizers utilize light to enact a chemical change in a substrate; after the chemical change, the photosensitizer returns to its initial state, remaining chemically unchanged from the process. Photoinitiators absorb light to become a reactive species, commonly a radical or an ion, where it then reacts with another chemical species. These photoinitiators are often completely chemically changed after their reaction. Photocatalysts accelerate chemical reactions which rely upon light. While some photosensitizers may act as photocatalysts, not all photocatalysts may act as photosensitizers. Photoacids (or photobases) are molecules which become more acidic (or basic) upon the absorption of light. Photoacids increase in acidity upon absorbing light and thermally reassociate back into their original form upon relaxing. Photoacid generators undergo an irreversible change to become an acidic species upon light absorption. Photopolymerization can occur in two ways. Photopolymerization can occur directly wherein the monomers absorb the incident light and begin polymerizing, or it can occur through a photosensitizer-mediated process where the photosensitizer absorbs the light first before transferring energy into the monomer species.

== History ==
Photosensitizers have existed within natural systems for as long as chlorophyll and other light sensitive molecules have been a part of plant life, but studies of photosensitizers began as early as the 1900s, where scientists observed photosensitization in biological substrates and in the treatment of cancer. Mechanistic studies related to photosensitizers began with scientists analyzing the results of chemical reactions where photosensitizers photo-oxidized molecular oxygen into peroxide species. The results were understood by calculating quantum efficiencies and fluorescent yields at varying wavelengths of light and comparing these results with the yield of reactive oxygen species. However, it was not until the 1960s that the electron donating mechanism was confirmed through various spectroscopic methods including reaction-intermediate studies and luminescence studies.

The term photosensitizer does not appear in scientific literature until the 1960s. Instead, scientists would refer to photosensitizers as sensitizers used in photo-oxidation or photo-oxygenation processes. Studies during this time period involving photosensitizers utilized organic photosensitizers, consisting of aromatic hydrocarbon molecules, which could facilitate synthetic chemistry reactions. However, by the 1970s and 1980s, photosensitizers gained attraction in the scientific community for their role within biologic processes and enzymatic processes. Currently, photosensitizers are studied for their contributions to fields such as energy harvesting, photoredox catalysis in synthetic chemistry, and cancer treatment.

Diagram of a Type I photosensitized reaction

== Types of photosensitization processes ==
There are two main pathways for photosensitized reactions.

=== Type I ===
In Type I photosensitized reactions, the photosensitizer is excited by a light source into a triplet state. The excited, triplet state photosensitizer then reacts with a substrate molecule which is not molecular oxygen to both form a product and reform the photosensitizer. Type I photosensitized reactions result in the photosensitizer being quenched by a different chemical substrate than molecular oxygen.

Diagram of a Type II photosensitized reaction

=== Type II ===
In Type II photosensitized reactions, the photosensitizer is excited by a light source into a triplet state. The excited photosensitizer then reacts with a ground state, triplet oxygen molecule. This excites the oxygen molecule into the singlet state, making it a reactive oxygen species. Upon excitation, the singlet oxygen molecule reacts with a substrate to form a product. Type II photosensitized reaction result in the photosensitizer being quenched by a ground state oxygen molecule which then goes on to react with a substrate to form a product.

== Composition of photosensitizers ==
Photosensitizers can be placed into 3 generalized domains based on their molecular structure. These three domains are organometallic photosensitizers, organic photosensitizers, and nanomaterial photosensitizers.

Pictured are Chlorophyll A (A) and Tris(2-phenylpyridine)iridium (B), two examples of organometallic photosensitizers.

=== Organometallic ===
Pictured from top to bottom, (A) benzophenone, (B) methylene blue, and (C) rose Bengal are all organic photosensitizers. All metals involved are purely counterions to keep the material in the solid state as a salt.

Organometallic photosensitizers contain a metal atom chelated to at least one organic ligand. The photosensitizing capacities of these molecules result from electronic interactions between the metal and ligand(s). Popular electron-rich metal centers for these complexes include Iridium, Ruthenium, and Rhodium. These metals, as well as others, are common metal centers for photosensitizers due to their highly filled d-orbitals, or high d-electron counts, to promote metal to ligand charge transfer from pi-electron accepting ligands. This interaction between the metal center and the ligand leads to a large continuum of orbitals within both the highest occupied molecular orbital (HOMO) and the lowest unoccupied molecular orbital (LUMO) which allows for excited electrons to switch multiplicities via intersystem crossing.

While many organometallic photosensitizer compounds are made synthetically, there also exists naturally occurring, light-harvesting organometallic photosensitizers as well. Some relevant naturally occurring examples of organometallic photosensitizers include Chlorophyll A and Chlorophyll B.

=== Organic ===
Organic photosensitizers are carbon-based molecules which are capable of photosensitizing. The earliest studied photosensitizers were aromatic hydrocarbons which absorbed light in the presence of oxygen to produce reactive oxygen species. These organic photosensitizers are made up of highly conjugated systems which promote electron delocalization. Due to their high conjugation, these systems have a smaller gap between the highest occupied molecular orbital (HOMO) and the lowest unoccupied molecular orbital (LUMO) as well as a continuum of orbitals within the HOMO and LUMO. The smaller band gap and the continuum of orbitals in both the conduction band and the valence band allow for these materials to enter their triplet state more efficiently, making them better photosensitizers. Some notable organic photosensitizers which have been studied extensively include benzophenones, methylene blue, rose Bengal, flavins, pterins and others.

=== Nanomaterials ===
A wide variety of nanomaterials function as photosensitizers.

Monatomic gaseous mercury (considered as the smallest possible cluster compound) is a photosensitizer catalyzing radical dehydrogenation.

==== Quantum dots ====
Colloidal quantum dots are nanoscale semiconductor materials with highly tunable optical and electronic properties. Quantum dots photosensitize via the same mechanism as organometallic photosensitizers and organic photosensitizers, but their nanoscale properties allow for greater control in distinctive aspects. Some key advantages to the use of quantum dots as photosensitizers includes their small, tunable band gap which allows for efficient transitions to the triplet state, and their insolubility in many solvents which allows for easy retrieval from a synthetic reaction mixture.

==== Nanorods ====
Nanorods, similar in size to quantum dots, have tunable optical and electronic properties. Based on their size and material composition, it is possible to tune the maximum absorption peak for nanorods during their synthesis. This control has led to the creation of photosensitizing nanorods.

== Applications ==
=== Medical ===
==== Photodynamic therapy ====
Photodynamic therapy utilizes Type II photosensitizers to harvest light to degrade tumors or cancerous masses. This discovery was first observed back in 1907 by Hermann von Tappeiner when he utilized eosin to treat skin tumors. The photodynamic process is predominantly a noninvasive technique. Firstly, a photosensitizer is administered either systemically or topically. After it has had sufficient time to selectively accumulate in the tumor cells, wavelength specific light is shined on the outside of the patient's affected area. This light (preferably near infrared frequency as this allows for deeper penetration of the tissue without acute toxicity) excites the photosensitizer's electrons into the triplet state. Upon excitation, the photosensitizer begins transferring energy to neighboring ground state triplet oxygen to generate excited singlet oxygen. The resulting excited oxygen species then degrades the tumor or cancerous mass.

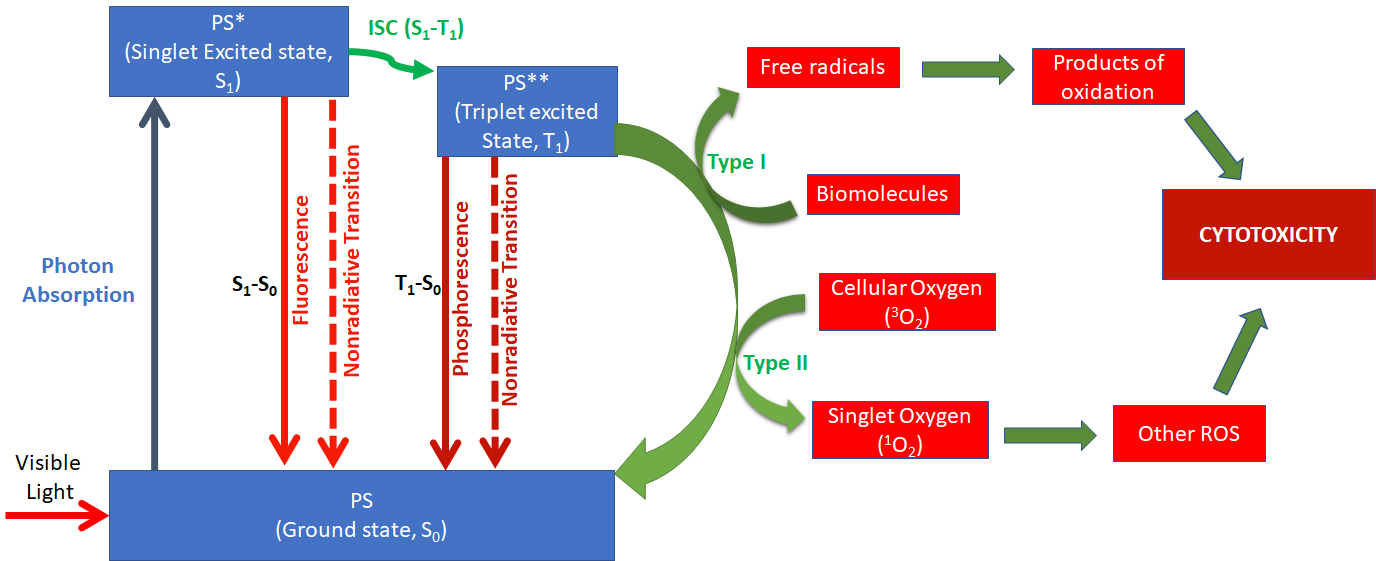
Modified Jablonski diagram showing the mechanism of PDT

In February 2019, medical scientists announced that iridium attached to albumin, creating a photosensitized molecule, can penetrate cancer cells and, after being irradiated with light (a process called photodynamic therapy), destroy the cancer cells.

Dye sensitized solar cells are photosensitizers which transfer energy to semiconductors to generate energy from solar light

=== Energy sources ===
==== Dye sensitized solar cells ====
In 1972, scientists discovered that chlorophyll could absorb sunlight and transfer energy into electrochemical cells. This discovery eventually led to the use of photosensitizers as sunlight-harvesting materials in solar cells, mainly through the use of photosensitizer dyes. Dye Sensitized Solar cells utilize these photosensitizer dyes to absorb photons from solar light and transfer energy rich electrons to the neighboring semiconductor material to generate electric energy output. These dyes act as dopants to semiconductor surfaces which allows for the transfer of light energy from the photosensitizer to electronic energy within the semiconductor. These photosensitizers are not limited to dyes. They may take the form of any photosensitizing structure, dependent on the semiconductor material to which they are attached.

==== Hydrogen generating catalysts ====
Via the absorption of light, photosensitizers can utilize triplet state transfer to reduce small molecules, such as water, to generate Hydrogen gas. As of right now, photosensitizers have generated hydrogen gas by splitting water molecules at a small, laboratory scale.

=== Synthetic chemistry ===
==== Photoredox chemistry ====
In the early 20th century, chemists observed that various aromatic hydrocarbons in the presence of oxygen could absorb wavelength specific light to generate a peroxide species. This discovery of oxygen's reduction by a photosensitizer led to chemists studying photosensitizers as photoredox catalysts for their roles in the catalysis of pericyclic reactions and other reduction and oxidation reactions. Photosensitizers in synthetic chemistry allow for the manipulation of electronic transitions within molecules through an externally applied light source. These photosensitizers used in redox chemistry may be organic, organometallic, or nanomaterials depending on the physical and spectral properties required for the reaction.

== Biological effects of photosensitizers ==
Photosensitizers that are readily incorporated into the external tissues can increase the rate at which reactive oxygen species are generated upon exposure to UV light (such as UV-containing sunlight). Some photosensitizing agents, such as St. John's Wort, appear to increase the incidence of inflammatory skin conditions in animals and have been observed to slightly reduce the minimum tanning dose in humans.

Some examples of photosensitizing medications (both investigatory and approved for human use) are:

- St. John's Wort
- 9-me-bc
- Doxepin
- Amoxapine
- Ethinyl estradiol

== See also ==
- Artificial photosynthesis
- Photosensitivity
- Photodynamic therapy
- Photocatalysis
- Dye-sensitized solar cell
- Photoredox catalysis
- Light harvesting materials
- Photoswitch
