= Body Balance System =

- Company type: Private
- Industry: Medical Devices
- Founded: 2006; 19 years ago
- Founder: Michael Londo
- Headquarters: Las Vegas, Nevada, U.S.
- Products: Red light therapy
- Website: bodybalancesystemonline.com

Body Balance System is an American medical device company that develops, manufactures, and sells low-level laser therapy (LLLT) therapy systems, specializing in red light therapy and photobiomodulation (PBM).

== History ==
Body Balance was founded in 2006 by engineer Michael Londo in Las Vegas, Nevada to experiment with products to help his daughter with a breathing disorder.

The company began developing red light therapy technologies in 2014.

In 2022, the company sold over 100 therapy beds per year for $50,000. In the same year the company introduced the Food and Drug Administration-registered OvationULT Red Light Therapy bed, which has been used at several resorts in the Las Vegas area, including the Aria, Vdara, Bellagio, Park MGM, Green Valley Ranch, and Red Rock. The bed produces 68 million milliwatts.
