= Virtue Oboro =

Nigerian visual artist

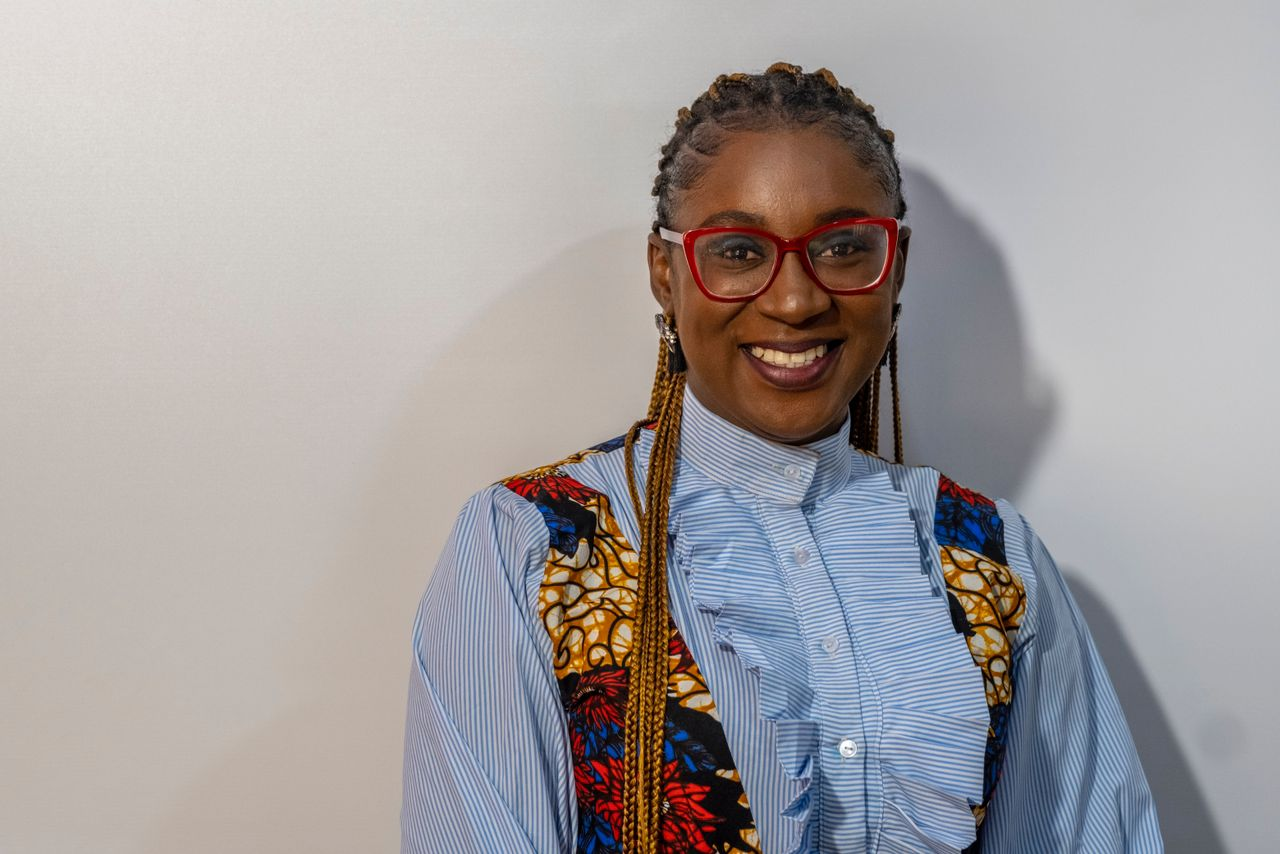
- Occupations: Entrepreneur and inventor of Crib A'Glow Phototherapy
- Employer: Tiny Hearts Technology
- Website: https://tinyheartshq.com/

Virtue Oboro is a Nigerian entrepreneur, and co-founder of Tiny Hearts Technology. In 2016, she developed and launched Crib ‘A Glow, an LED-lit portable crib that treats jaundice utilizing solar energy, and patented the innovation in 2017.

Virtue serves as campaign coordinator for Yellow Alert Foundation, a non-profit dedicated to training nurses, midwives, and community health workers across rural Nigeria. She volunteers for the Olive Mentorship Program, Education Africa Foundation, and the Lutheran Refugee Program.

== Education ==
Virtue completed a bachelor's degree in Fine and Applied Arts at the Cross River State University of Technology and a certificate in Entrepreneurial Management from the Enterprise Development Center, Pan-Atlantic University, Lagos state. Thereafter she earned a master's degree from Heriot-Watt University, United Kingdom.

== Tiny Hearts Company ==
The Tiny Hearts Technology company was established by Virtue and her husband, Ezoukumo Oboro. The company manufactures Crib A'Glow, a solar-powered device to treat neonatal jaundice as well as incubators and diaper rash creams for preterm babies. Tiny Hearts is composed of biomedical engineers, designers, and medical professionals. The organization coordinates the Yellow Alert Program, an initiative that educates and raises awareness of neonatal jaundice among health workers and women. Virtue Oboro serves as the director of innovation, at Tiny Hearts Technology.

== Cribs A'Glow ==
The Crib A'Glow is a portable, affordable phototherapy device made in Nigeria. The innovation is recognized around the world and has saved 550,000 babies in more than 500 hospitals across Nigeria, Ghana, Kenya, and Benin. In order to facilitate infant recovery, hospitals, health centers, and first-time mothers purchase or rent cribs. COVID-19 caused a high demand for cribs, as parents wanted to avoid hospitals while caring for their newborns.

== Awards ==
Virtue's Tiny Hearts Technology and Crib A'Glow innovation won a $50,000 prize as the winner of the African Innovation Challenge 2.0 by Johnson & Johnson and the Unilever Young Entrepreneurs Award. In 2020, her company was awarded the third-place prize for digital innovation by the American Business Council and the United States Chamber of Commerce. She was selected to compete for the Royal Academy of Engineering's Africa Prize in 2022. Also, she was awarded the Mandela Washington Fellow, the Sterling Bank Startups(2nd place), and the Diamond Bank awards.

== Works ==
- Oboro, Virtue & Xia, Guobin. (2022). User Experience Design- A conceptual campaign to launch a crowdfunding web platform for color light therapy. User Experience Seminar Presentation. 10.13140/RG.2.2.33205.96486
- Oboro Virtue(2022). Changes in Coca-Cola from the Pandemic. Change Management Seminar at Heriot-Watt University. 10.13140/RG.2.2.29850.52168
- Oboro, Virtue. (2022). Change Management. Change Management Seminar at Heriot-Watt University. 10.13140/RG.2.2.23139.6352
- Oboro, Virtue & Xia, Guobin. (2022). UXD Research Project. 10.13140/RG.2.2.19784.19205.
- Oboro, Virtue. (2022). An Empathic Design Approach on the Heriot-Watt University (Scottish borders) main hall. Conference: Design Thinking and Innovation.

== Gallery ==
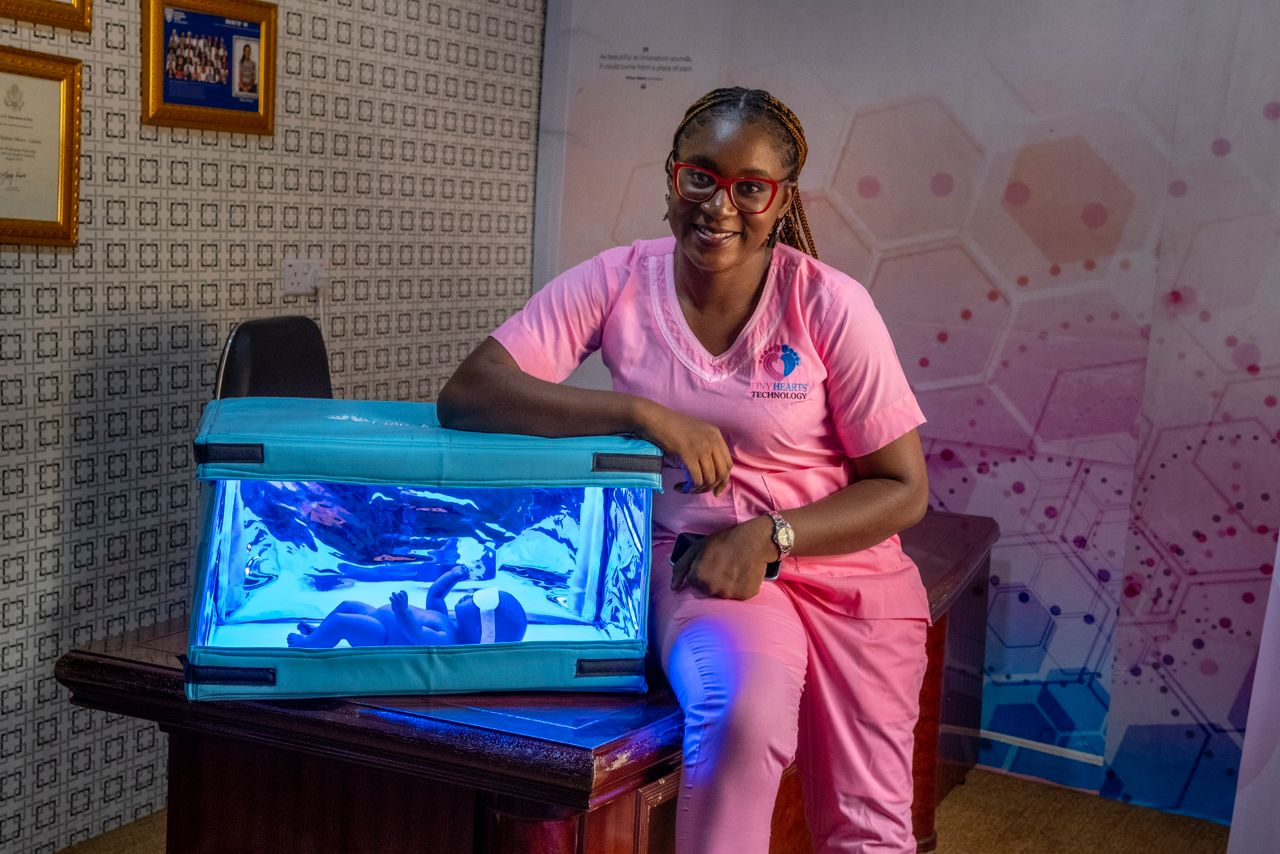

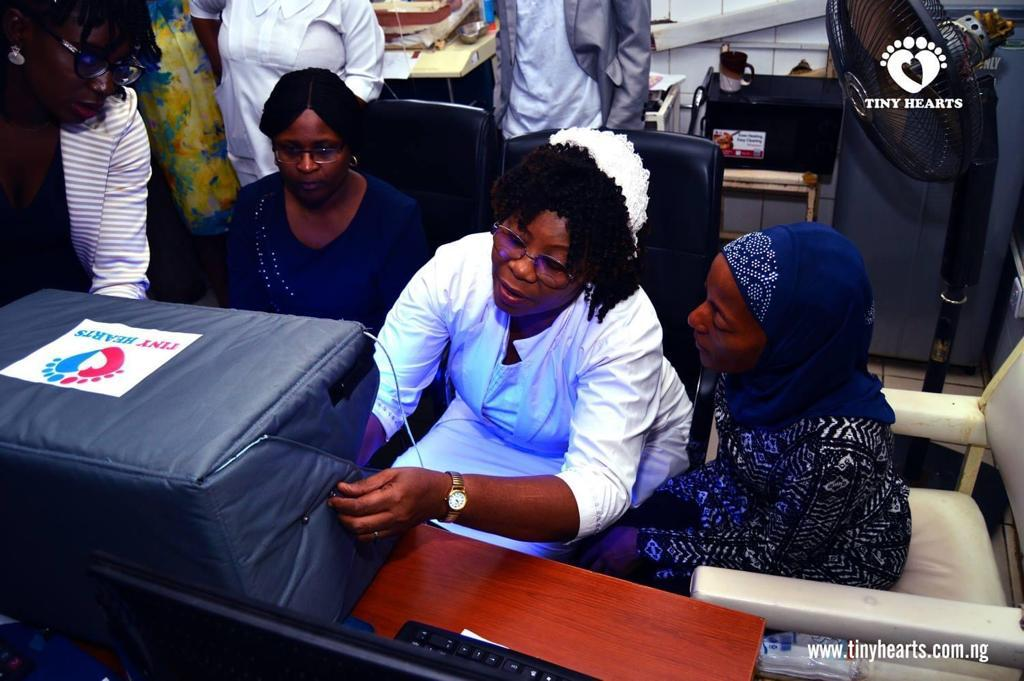

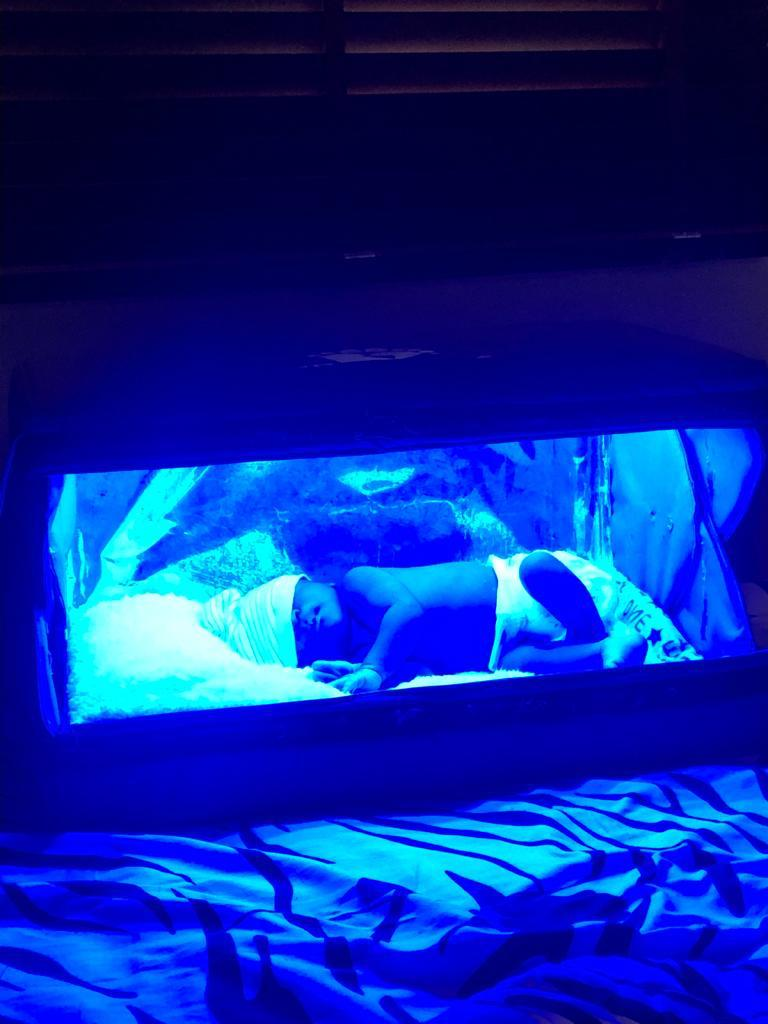

== See also ==
Crib A'Glow
