= Blood irradiation therapy =

Alternative medical procedure

- Other names: Ultraviolet blood irradiation therapy; Haemoirradiation
- Specialty: Hematology

Blood irradiation therapy is an alternative medical procedure in which the blood is exposed to low-level light (often laser light) for therapeutic reasons. The practice was originally developed in the United States, but most recent research on it has been conducted in Germany (by UV lamps) and in Russia (in all variants). Low-level laser therapy has been tested for a wide range of conditions, but rigorous double-blinded studies have not yet been performed. Furthermore, it has been claimed that ultraviolet irradiation of blood kills bacteria by DNA damage and also activation of the immune system. Blood irradiation therapy is highly controversial, and has fallen from mainstream use since its heyday in the 1940s and 1950s.

Blood irradiation therapy can be administered in three ways: extracorporeally, transcutaneously, and intravenously. The extracorporeal (outside the body) method removes blood from the body and irradiates it in a special cuvette (tube). This method is used for the ultraviolet (UV) blood irradiation (UVBI) by UV lamps. In the transcutaneous method, the radiation goes through the skin, by placing a device on the outside of the skin. In the intravenous method, a device is inserted into a large blood vessel. The laser light is monochromatic.

It is not related to the practice of gamma irradiation of blood in transfusion medicine.

== History ==
In 1928, Dr. Emmet Knott and a medical student named Lester Edblom received a United States patent for a "Means for Treating Blood-Stream Infection" that incorporated a rudimentary ultraviolet bulb, vacuum extraction system and a cuvette. The "Knott Hemo-Irradiator" was used from the 1930s through the 1950s on patients with multiple infectious diseases.

George P Miley at the Hahnemann Hospital in Philadelphia, Pennsylvania, published a series of articles on the use of the procedure in the treatment of thrombophlebitis, staphylococcal sepsis, peritonitis, botulism, poliomyelitis, non-healing wounds, and asthma.

One of the best known and most comprehensive set of studies was published in 1947 by Dr. George Miley and Dr. Jens A Christensen (from the Blood Irradiation Clinic of the Hahnemann Medical College and Hospital of Philadelphia, Pennsylvania). The authors studied 445 cases of acute pyogenic infections and 74 cases of virus and virus-like infections. Findings included the following: sulfonamide-resistant and penicillin-resistant infections have responded to the treatment. Further finding included: "We have observed that toxemias due to various virus and virus-like infections subside rapidly …" Some of the more impressive results included cases involving septic infection, 57 out of 57 cases recovered. In treating peritonitis, 16 out of 18 patients recovered. With puerperal sepsis, 14 out of 14 patients recovered. With thrombophlebitis, 34 out of 34 recovered. The authors emphasized the need to follow the protocol set for by Knott. Of importance, this protocol included the use of a chamber or cuvette with a flat quartz surface.

Henry A Barrett at the Willard Parker Hospital in New York City, in 1940 reported on 110 cases including a number of infections. Twenty-nine different conditions were described as responding including the following: infectious arthritis, septic abortion, osteoarthritis, tuberculosis glands, chronic blepharitis, mastoiditis, uveitis, furunculosis, chronic paranasal sinusitis, acne vulgaris, and secondary anemia.

This procedure fell out of favor in the late 1950s, at a time when antibiotics and the polio vaccine were becoming widely used. Since then it has been sidelined as a type of alternative and complementary medicine.

The U.S. Food and Drug Administration (FDA) has approved one type of this treatment for T cell lymphoma. This particular process was developed by a team at Yale, led by Richard Edelson who developed a photopheresis machine. This machine separates the white and red blood cells. The white cells are then routed into a blood chamber, where those cells are subjected to UV light from the UVA part of the spectrum. This process uses a photosensitizing agent which enhances the effectiveness of the light. Observational evidence suggests that photopheresis might be effective in the treatment of graft-versus-host disease, though controlled trials are needed to support this use.

The American Cancer Society lists blood irradiation therapy as one of many types of ineffective cancer treatment fraudulently sold by alternative cancer treatment clinics in Mexico.

== Types ==
=== Intravenous laser blood irradiation ===
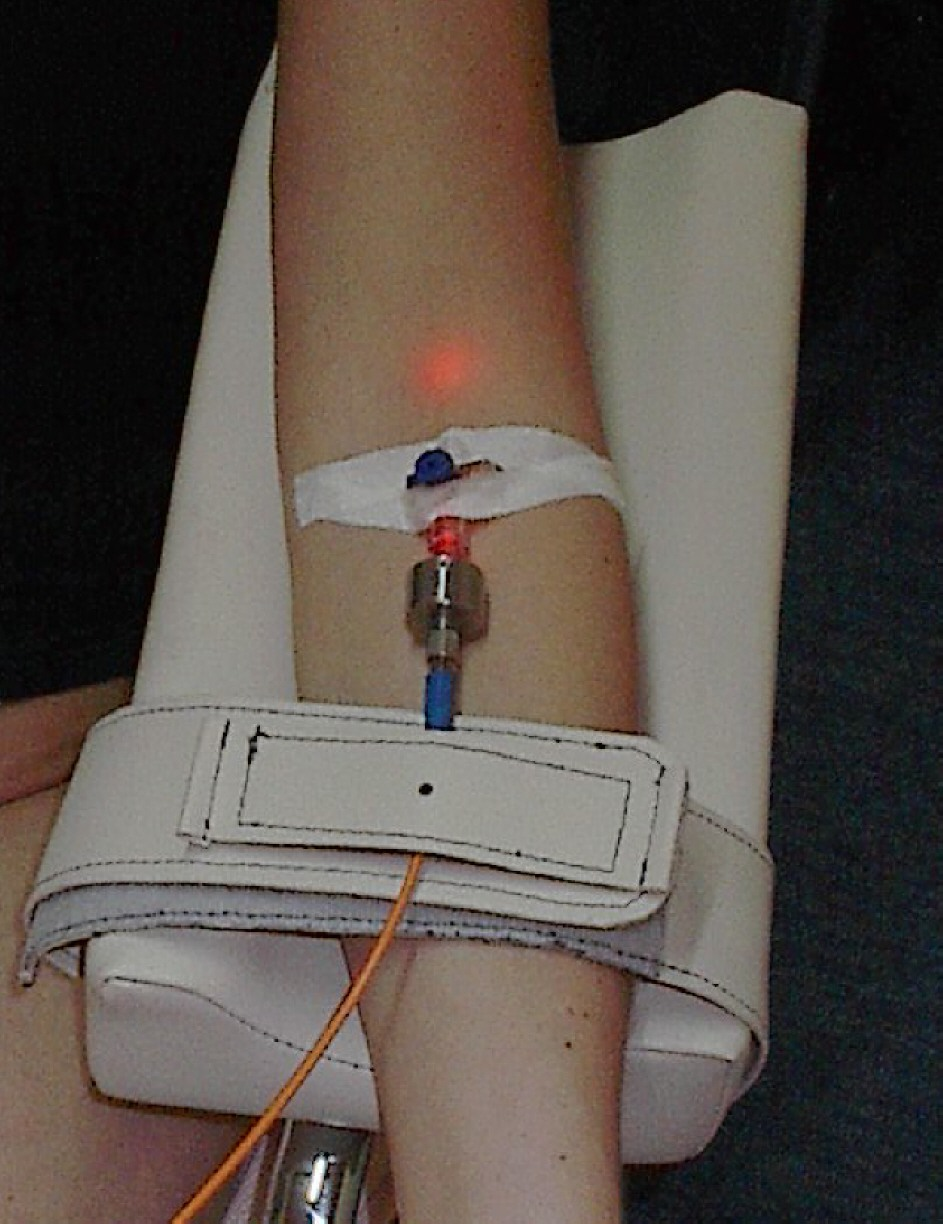
Intravenous blood irradiation

Intravenous or intravascular laser blood irradiation (ILBI) involves the in-vivo illumination of the blood by feeding low level laser light generated by a 1–3 mW helium–neon laser at a wavelength of 632.8 nanometers (nm) into a vascular channel, usually a vein in the forearm, under the assumption that any therapeutic effect will be circulated through the circulatory system. Most often wavelengths of 365, 405, 525 and 635 nm and power of 2.3 mW are used. The technique is widely used at present in Russia, less in Asia, and not extensively in other parts of the world. It is shown that ILBI improves blood flow and its transport activities, therefore, tissue tropism, has a positive effect on the immune system and cell metabolism. This issue is subject to skepticism.

=== Transcutaneous laser blood irradiation ===
Transcutaneous therapy applies laser light on unbroken skin in areas with large numbers of blood vessels (such as the forearm). Because of the skin acting as a barrier to the blood, absorbing low level laser energy, the power of the laser is often boosted to compensate. The problem can be solved by using pulsed matrix laser light sources.

=== Extracorporeal irradiation ===
Extracorporeal irradiation is used only for ultraviolet blood irradiation, that involves drawing blood out through a vein and irradiating it outside of the body.

Though promoted as a treatment for cancer, a 1952 review in the Journal of the American Medical Association and another review by the American Cancer Society in 1970 concluded the treatment was ineffective.

== See also ==
- Caesium-137
- Light therapy
- Photodynamic therapy
- Photopheresis
