= Zoo Med Laboratories =

American pet product company

Zoo Med Laboratories, Inc.
- Type: Privately held corporation
- Industry: Pets and Zoos
- Founder: Gary Bagnall
- Headquarters: San Luis Obispo, California, USA,
- Key people: Gary Bagnall (Founder/CEO); Steve Dalrymple (COO); Ken Fontes (CFO); Rita Zarate (VP Sales)
- Products: Reptile, Aquarium, and Bird Care Products
- Number of employees: 150
- Website: zoomed.com

Zoo Med Laboratories, Inc. is a manufacturer of specialty pet products for reptiles, amphibians, fish, insects, birds, and small mammals. The company was founded by Gary Bagnall in 1977 and is based in San Luis Obispo, California.

== History ==
At age 19, Gary Bagnall started a live reptile import/export business called "In Cold Blood" out of a one-car garage in Costa Mesa, California. In 1978, Gary partnered with Elaphe snake breeder, Lloyd Lemke and the name changed to Orange County Zoological. In 1979, Gary and Lloyd parted ways, and the name changed again to California Zoological Supply.

Between 1979 and 1981, California Zoological Supply was the first to import Uromastyx aegyptius, Pacific Island boas, and albino Columbian red-tailed boas into the United States.

In 1984, while running California Zoological Supply (i.e. Cal Zoo), Gary procured the first vitamin supplement designed specifically for reptiles under the trademark name "ReptiVite". With this vitamin, the business split into two, with Cal Zoo remaining open for importing reptiles, and the dry goods portion of the business being named Zoo Med Laboratories, Inc. (i.e. Zoo Med).

In 1993, Zoo Med invented the first UVB fluorescent lamp for reptile care. These bulbs replicate the portion of the sun's spectrum that is responsible for Vitamin D3 synthesis.

In September 2020, PETA, a US animal rights organization, filed a lawsuit against the company, claiming that the business encourages consumers to buy enclosures that could be harmful to snakes. Later in 2021, it gave the firm "Pants on Fire" award. It was given for "disingenuously convincing customers that snakes can live in a tank as small as half the length of their body".
