= Theradome =

Medical device for hair growth

Theradome or the Theradome Laser Helmet, is a medical device manufactured by American health technology company Theradome, Inc. The device is a helmet embedded with laser phototherapy technology used for hair restoration treatments in men and women.

Its inventor is a former NASA BioMedical Engineer, Tamim Hamid. and cleared by the FDA in August 2013.

== History ==
Theradome was invented by Tamim Hamid and based on research by Hungarian scientist Endre Mester, who noticed that exposure to lasers caused mice to grow hair.

In 2013 Hamid founded Theradome after a successful Indiegogo crowdfunding campaign and released the Theradome Laser Helmet. The device was initially only cleared by the FDA for use by women. It was the first laser helmet to be cleared by the FDA for sale over-the-counter.

Theradome conducted clinical trials for the use of their device to treat androgenetic alopecia in men from 2015-2016. Though the trial was supposed to report in 2016, no results have been reported.

In 2018, Theradome’s PRO LH80 and EVOLH40 Laser Helmet were cleared by the FDA for use by both men and women.
