= High Emissivity Aluminiferous Luminescent Substrate =

Infrared technology developed by NASA

High Emissivity Aluminiferous Luminescent Substrate, or HEALS, is an infrared technology developed by NASA. Originally developed as part of experiments for plant growing in space, it has since been used to reduce pain in several applications.

== Applications ==
HEALS was developed in the early 1990s for experimenting with plant growth in space. Through a partnership between Quantum Devices and the NASA-sponsored Wisconsin Center for Space Automation and Robotics at the University of Wisconsin-Madison, the Astroculture 3 plant growth chamber was developed using HEALS technology for use aboard Space Shuttles.

Following its initial development, Quantum Devices developed the WARP 10 and more powerful WARP 75 devices that utilize HEALS infrared for medical use. The technology has been used to reduce the painful side effects resulting from chemotherapy and radiation treatment in bone marrow and stem cell transplant patients. A two-year clinical trial at the University of Alabama at Birmingham resulted in bone marrow and stem cell transplant recipients reporting an improvement in pain following light treatment from WARP 10 and WARP 75 devices.

The application of HEALS has also been proven to aid in the healing of human wounds, burns, diabetic skin ulcers and oral mucositis. The WARP 75 is also used for the treatment of chronic pain, including the temporary relief of minor muscle and joint pain, arthritis, muscle spasms, and stiffness, by promoting relaxation of muscle tissue and temporarily increasing local blood circulation.

== Technology ==
WARP 75 uses 670 nm LEDs, thus the bright red color and can produce 5 Joules/cm2 every 88 seconds.

== See also ==
- Light therapy
- Chemotherapy
