= Woronoff's ring =

- Specialty: Dermatology

Woronoff's ring is a skin condition characterized by a blanched halo of approximately uniform width surrounding psoriatic lesions after phototherapy or topical treatments.

== See also ==
- Psoriasis
- List of cutaneous conditions
