= Fluorescence biomodulation =

Fluorescence biomodulation is a form of photobiomodulation, which utilizes fluorescence energy to induce multiple transduction pathways that can modulate biological processes through the activation of photoacceptors found within many different cell and tissue types. According to Magalhães and Yoshimura, photoacceptors are molecules that do not explicitly specialize in light absorption but possess the ability to do so in the presence of light which in turn can enhance their functioning.

To generate fluorescence, specialized light absorbing molecules (chromophores) are employed to translate light energy into a high-energy emission of fluorescence through a mechanism known as stokes shift. Fluorescence biomodulation differs from photobiomodulation in that it employs fluorescence as a photo vehicle to induce biomodulation. Fluorescence, as generated by chromophores, is displayed as a broad spectral distribution of wavelengths and/or frequencies which can be controlled to penetrate tissues to various degrees. Tailoring fluorescence biomodulation allows compatibility between the specific emissions of fluorescence and the unique light absorbing characteristics of different cell and tissue types in the body. Shorter wavelengths (<600 nm) within the visible spectrum cannot penetrate deep into tissue and are localized within the epidermis or dermis. Conversely, longer wavelengths (>600 nm) within the visible spectrum penetrate further up into the hypodermis.
