= Grow It Back =

2023 book by Tamim S. Hamid

- Cover of the 2023 Digital Foton edition
- Author: Tamim S. Hamid
- Language: English
- Subject: Hair loss, laser phototherapy
- Publisher: Digital Foton
- Publication date: October 15, 2023
- Pages: 446
- ISBN: 979-8218099114

Grow It Back: How Laser Phototherapy Stops Hair Loss and Regrows Your Hair is a 2023 science book on hair loss and laser phototherapy written by biomedical engineer and former NASA scientist Tamim S. Hamid. The book received a Gold Award at the Literary Titan Book Awards and a PenCraft Book Award in the Non Fiction – Health/Medical category.

== Overview ==
The book addresses hair loss by discussing the biological processes behind hair growth and loss, including hair follicles, cellular energy, genetics, and environmental factors. It also presents laser phototherapy as a solution for hair loss, explaining topics such as cold laser technology, light therapy, safety measures, and common myths about laser phototherapy.

== Reception ==
In 2023, the book received an honorable mention in the General Non-Fiction category at the New England Book Festival.

In 2024, the book won in the Non Fiction – Health/Medical category of the Winter edition of the PenCraft Seasonal Book Awards. The same year, it received an honorable mention in the Regional Lit category at the 2024 Southern California Book Festival. The book also received a Gold Award at the Literary Titan Book Awards.
