= University of Cross River State =

Public university in Nigeria

- UNICROSS
- Motto: Technology for human advancement
- Type: Public
- Established: August 2002 as Cross River University of Technology (CRUTECH); Renamed in 2021
- Affiliations: NUC
- Vice-Chancellor: Prof. Francisca Bassey
- Students: 18,915
- Location: Calabar, Cross River State, Nigeria
- Campus: Urban
- Website: www.unicross.edu.ng

University of Cross River State (also known as UNICROSS) is a Cross River State-owned tertiary institution with four campuses spread across four Local Government Areas of the state. The university was formerly known as the Cross River University of Technology (CRUTECH).

The university was established in 2002 by the then Governor Donald Duke by merging three higher institutions: The Polytechnic of Calabar, The College of Education, and Ibrahim Babangida College of Agriculture. It offers degree courses at undergraduate and post graduate levels.

It was renamed in February 2021 by a bill passed at Cross River State House of Assembly which was then approved by the Governor of the State, Benedict Ayade. The change of the tertiary institution's name was to enable the varsity function as a conventional university, which provides the opportunity to offer more professional courses rather focusing on tech-related courses. The present Acting-Vice Chancellor of the institution is Prof. Francisca Bassey.

The university took back the indigenous name of the state which was held by the University of Cross River State, Uyo now the University of Uyo, Akwa Ibom State, Nigeria till 1 October 1991 when the Federal government of Nigeria established the University of Uyo as a Federal University after the separation of the Akwa Ibom Region from Cross River State in 1987. The University of Uyo inherited students, staff, academic programmes and the entire facilities of the then University of Cross River State established by Cross River State in 1983.

The offices of the Vice-Chancellor, Deputy Vice-Chancellor and the Bursar are all located in the Calabar Campus, considered the main campus of the Institution, which is located in Calabar South Local Government Area of Cross River State in Southern Nigeria.

The university currently has campuses in Calabar, Obubra, Ogoja and Okuku. Faculties and Departments at the University of Cross River State includes;

- Faculty of Biological Sciences: Microbiology, Animal Health and Environmental Biology, Plant Science and Biotechnology.
- Faculty of Education: Educational management, Vocational and Technical Education, Human Kinetics and Health Education, Educational Foundations and Administration, Curriculum and Instructional Technology, Library and Information Science, Guidance and Counselling.
- Faculty of Engineering: Civil Engineering, Electrical/Electronic Engineering, Mechanical Engineering, Wood Product Engineering.
- Faculty of Communication Technology: Mass Communication.
- Faculty of Environmental Science; Urban and Regional Planning, Estate Management, Visual Arts and Technology.
- Faculty of Architecture: Architecture: Architectural Design, Sustainable Architecture and Urban Design.
- Faculty of Physical Sciences: Chemistry, Physics, Mathematics & Statistics, Computer Science, Biochemistry.
- Faculty of Management Sciences: Accountancy, Marketing, Hospitality and Tourism, Business Administration.
- Faculty of Basic Medical Sciences: Human Physiology, Human Anatomy and Forensic Anthropology, Medical Biochemistry.
- Faculty of Agriculture and Forestry: Animal Science, Agronomy, Agric. Econs. and Extension, Fishery and Aquatic Sciences, Forestry and Wildlife Management.

== Notable alumni ==
- Beebee Bassey
- Virtue Oboro
- Aniebiet Inyang Ntui

== See also ==
- List of universities in Nigeria
