= Beebee Bassey =

Nigerian singer and musician (born 1993)

- Born: Blessing Bassey Okon; 30 June 1993 (age 33); Calabar, Cross River State
- Education: Cross River State University of Technology

Blessing Bassey Okon (born 30 July 1993), professionally known as Beebee Bassey, is a Nigerian singer, songwriter and guitarist. She first gained recognition during her participation in the 2014 edition of Nigerian Idol.

== Early life and education ==
Bassey was born on born 30 July 1993 in Calabar, Cross River State, Nigeria. Raised in a Christian household with both her parents serving as pastors, she developed an early interest in music and began singing in church at the age of thirteen. Growing up, Bassey struggled with learning difficulties, including dyslexia and dyscalculia.

She received her primary and secondary education in Port Harcourt, Rivers State, where she also spent most of her childhood. In 2021, she earned a Bachelor’s degree in Mass Communication from the Cross River State University of Technology (CRUTECH).

== Music career ==
Bassey first garnered public attention in 2011 as the first runner-up in Voice of Cross River. She later rose to national prominence after finishing among the top five contestants in Nigerian Idol in 2014.

In 2020, she won the Karaoke World Championships (KWC) Nigeria. This led her to represent Nigeria globally in the KWC. In 2020, she released her first official single "Incredible God". In 2024, she released "Toxic Places", a song addressing and raising awareness about domestic abuse.

== Selected discography ==
- "Incredible God" (2020)
- "Live for You (Live)" (2020)
- "Toxic Places" (2024)
- "Letter from God (I Am God)" (2024)
