= Francisca Bassey =

Nigerian academic

Vice-Chancellor University of Cross River State
- Incumbent
- Assumed office 17 July 2021
- Appointed by: Bassey Otu
- Preceded by: Austin Angba

Personal details
- Born: Calabar, Nigeria

Francisca Bassey is a Nigerian academic. She is a professor, She was appointed on 17th July 2025 as substantive vice chancellor in University of Cross River State by the cross river state governor, Bassey Otu.
