= Crib A'Glow =

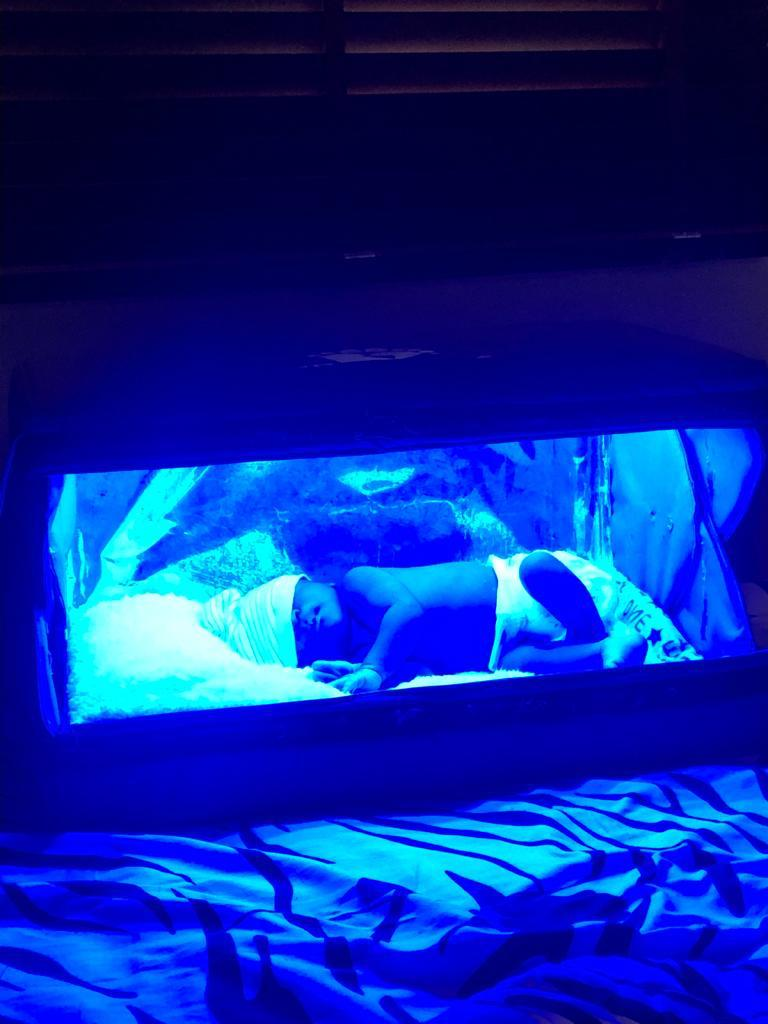
Crib A' Glow

Crib A'Glow is a portable solar-powered phototherapy unit that uses blue LED lights to treat infants with jaundice. The device was invented by Virtue Oboro, a visual designer and mother whose newborn son had developed jaundice. Crib A'Glow has won multiple prizes for innovation.

== Background ==
Crib A'Glow was conceptualized in 2015 by Virtue Oboro after her newborn son suffered from severe neonatal jaundice and required an emergency blood transfusion due to a hospital power outage and lack of functional phototherapy equipment. Alongside her husband, Ezoukumo Oboro, who possessed experience in solar energy infrastructure, she co-founded the social enterprise Tiny Hearts Technology to engineer an affordable, climate-resilient solution for under-resourced medical facilities. Jaundice affects more than 60% of newborns throughout the world, with the most serious cases requiring phototherapy. In Nigeria, it is estimated that fewer than 5% of medical facilities have sufficient phototherapy devices to treat the condition. Approximately 100,000 infants die annually from jaundice, with many more experiencing permanent injuries.

== Growth ==
The couple collaborated with pediatricians to ensure compliance with clinical phototherapy guidelines. The team spent 2016 and 2017 prototyping a foldable, portable crib constructed from local Nigerian materials. The innovation was officially patented in 2017. By utilizing low-power blue LED lights rather than traditional fluorescent bulbs, the design mitigated common phototherapy side effects such as skin burns, dehydration, and rashes. In 2018, the startup gained initial regional traction when it was selected as part of the Amref Health Africa "Innovate for Life Fund" cohort, allowing them to test early units in suburban and rural clinics.

Between 2019 and 2022, Crib A'Glow transitioned from a localized pilot program into a widely recognized medical device enterprise backed by international engineering and corporate grants. By late 2021, the manufacturing cost of a Crib A’Glow unit was optimized to approximately $360, roughly one-sixth of the $2,000 cost of importing standard phototherapy machinery into Nigeria. International reporting by CNN and The Guardian in early 2022 confirmed that the startup's solar-powered units had expanded deployment to hundreds of hospitals across Nigeria and neighboring Ghana, safely treating an estimated 300,000 infants.

== Awards ==
Johnson & Johnson awarded Crib A'Glow $50,000 as one of six winners of its Champions of Science Africa Innovation Challenge 2.0. Tiny Hearts Technology, Oboro's company, received the third-place prize from the Africa Business Center of the United States Chamber of Commerce for its inaugural Digital Innovation Awards in 2020. The device was selected by the Royal Academy of Engineering for the Africa Prize 2022 shortlist.
