= Auguste Rollier =

Swiss physician and climatologist

- Born: 1 October 1874; Saint-Aubin, Fribourg
- Died: 30 October 1954 (aged 80); Vaud
- Occupations: Physician, climatologist

Auguste Rollier (1 October 1874 - 30 October 1954) was a Swiss physician best known for his research on heliotherapy.

== History ==
Rollier was born at Saint-Aubin, Fribourg. He was educated at Zurich and Berne Universities and graduated in medicine in 1898. He worked under Emil Theodor Kocher for four years. In 1903, Rollier opened his Institute of Heliotherapy in Leysin. He advocated fresh air, physical exercise, rest and sunshine to treat his patients. He became known for his treatment of skeletal tuberculosis by heliotherapy (light therapy). He combined sunbathing with climatic treatment by cold air and high altitude. After World War I, it was reported that 1746 of 2167 patients had recovered their health under his care.

Rollier was influenced by the research of Niels Ryberg Finsen and established sunbathing clinics in the Swiss Alps. R. A. Hobday noted that "Rollier practised sunlight therapy at Leysin for over forty years and had thirty-six clinics with a total of more than 1,000 beds." After antimicrobial therapy became available, heliotherapy for tuberculosis was no longer practiced. Rollier was elected an honorary member of the American Clinical and Climatological Association in 1923.

== Selected publications ==
- La Cure de Soleil (1914)
- Heliotherapy (1923)
- Heliotherapy, With Special Consideration of Surgical Tuberculosis (1927)
