= Dora Colebrook =

Doctor and bacteriologist

Dora Challis Colebrook
- Born: 1884
- Died: 1965 (aged 80–81)
- Education: Royal Free Hospital London; University of London
- Known for: Bacteriology

Dora Challis Colebrook (1884–1965) was a medical doctor and bacteriologist. Her research into the efficacy of light therapy and the epidemiology of puerperal sepsis provided the first evidence-based evaluations of these subjects.

== Early life ==
Colebrook was the youngest daughter of May (1838–1896) and Mary Colebrook (née Gower, 1845) with three brothers and sisters, and seven half-siblings from her father's first marriage. The family lived in Guildford, Surrey until her father died in 1896 when they moved to Bournemouth.

Colebrook studied at the Royal Free Hospital in London, gaining her M.B. in 1915 and then M.D. from University of London in 1919. She also gained a Diploma in Bacteriology.

== Career ==
She worked initially at the now defunct Jessop Hospital in Sheffield, Yorkshire as a gynaecologist, then moved to Cambridge in general practice. She then moved to the North Islington Infant Welfare Centre in London. Her career then re-focused on research.

She was appointed as the secretary to the Medical Research Council's Clinical and Biological Sub-Committee to the Committee on the Biological Actions of Light after an introduction from her brother, the bacteriologist Leonard Colebrook. At that time, light therapy from white or ultraviolet light, was becoming increasing popular for an increasing range of conditions. Her research focused on two areas where it was considered to be effective, namely therapy for varicose ulcers and for generically 'sickly' children. A study of 85 patients with varicose ulcers, comparing light therapy with conventional treatment using paste and dressings, indicated that the latter gave a much better outcome. Her second study, of 287 infant school children, despite some problems with the experimental design, also did not demonstrate a beneficial effect of light therapy. The study compared three treatments namely with UV light therapy, a treatment where the UV light was screened from the children using glass, and a control group who were not treated with light therapy. In a later randomised controlled trial of coalminers, office and factory workers, she was again unable to show a clear benefit of light therapy.

Her initial findings about light therapy were controversial since the medical consensus in 1920s held that the well-established light therapy was effective. She was still involved in controversy over the efficacy of light therapy into the late 1940s.

Colebrook worked with her brother on the epidemiology of puerperal sepsis at Queen Charlotte's Hospital, London where she was a Leverhulme Research Fellow. She investigated the source of the streptococcal infections within the hospital. After collecting samples of the bacteria from patients, their families and hospital staff, she used immunology to identify individual streptococcal strains. This showed that the strains causing puerperal sepsis were not special but were the same ones present in the community that caused sore throats. They were acquired by women after childbirth rather than before. Working together, the Colebrooks showed that streptococci were more likely to originate from hospital staff than from the patient.
