= UV-B lamps =

Lamp that emits ultraviolet light to treat disease

UV-B lamps are lamps that emit a spectrum of ultraviolet light with wavelengths ranging from 290–320 nanometers. This spectrum is also commonly called the biological spectrum due to the human body's sensitivity to light of such a wavelength. UV-B light does not tan the skin very much, compared to the UV-A lamps that are used in tanning beds.

== Treating skin diseases ==
The main use of UVB lamps is as phototherapy lamp, meaning treating skin diseases with light. The diseases UV-B lamps treat are psoriasis, vitiligo, lichen planus, atopic dermatitis (eczema), and other skin diseases.

Thousands of dermatology clinics around the world treat skin ailments using UV-B lamps. Many people who suffer from psoriasis or other skin diseases have their own UV-B lamp at home. A small lamp is used to treat small areas of the skin, while full body cabins treat the whole body, mainly at clinics and hospitals.

Overexposure to UV-B light can burn the skin, so the exposure time must be regulated by a timer that turns off the lamp.

== Increasing vitamin D3 ==
When the skin is exposed to UVB light of 293 nanometers, it creates vitamin D3.

== Types of UVB lamps ==
The ideal wavelength for stimulating vitamin D3 production and treating skin conditions is 293 nanometers. Currently, only LED lamps can achieve this with a peak wavelength of 293 nanometers. This precise wavelength requires a minimal dose of about 0.1 joules per square centimeter, which is sufficient for effective results without causing skin redness or necessitating a gradual increase in dosage. This allows for visible effects on the skin within the same day.

In contrast, fluorescent UVB lamps come in two types: broadband (or wideband) and narrowband. Broadband UVB lamps cast light in the 290-320 nanometer range, with a peak wavelength of 306 nanometers. Since only a small portion of their spectrum falls near the optimal 293 nanometers, these lamps require a higher dose of 0.5 joules per square centimeter. This dose must be increased gradually, as there is a risk of skin burns.

Narrowband UVB lamps, on the other hand, emit light at 311 nanometer wavelength. These lamps require a dose of 2 joules per square centimeter to achieve the same therapeutic effect as a 293 nanometer lamp, which is 20 times higher. This makes them less efficient compared to LEDs but still useful for specific treatments.

== UVB light in the sun rays ==
Sunlight contains a small amount of light in the 280-315 nanometer range, which is essential for vitamin D synthesis. This is why 15 to 30 minutes of daily sun exposure is usually recommended. In Northern European countries, especially during winter when sunlight is limited, pregnant women may receive UVB light therapy in clinics to ensure their babies have adequate vitamin D3 levels at birth.

Animals also require UVB light to produce vitamin D3, which is crucial for bone health. UVB lamps are commonly used in zoos and homes for reptiles, snakes, turtles, and other animals to help them maintain proper vitamin D3 levels.

== Cancer risks ==
UV-B treatments for skin conditions such as psoriasis, vitiligo, and atopic dermatitis are administered in very low doses, often lasting only a few minutes or less than a minute when using lamps emitting 290-320 nanometer light. This low dosage does not increase the risk of skin cancer, and UV-B phototherapy remains a very safe treatment. Research citing ten years of experience with phototherapy at Yonsei Medical Center has not revealed any cases of skin malignancy.

However, excessive exposure to ultraviolet radiation, especially at undesirable wavelengths, can cause direct DNA damage, sunburn, and increase the risk of skin cancer. In contrast to low-dose UV-B exposure, UV-A light increases the risk of skin cancer because it penetrates deeper into the epidermis and is typically administered at much higher dosages.
