= Richard Edelson =

- Education: Yale School of Medicine
- Employer: Yale School of Medicine
- Title: Brady Professor of Dermatology

Richard Edelson is the Anthony Brady Professor of Dermatology at the Yale School of Medicine. He is a past director of the Yale Cancer Center, and an elected fellow of both the American Society for Clinical Investigation and the Association of American Physicians. He is known for his research discoveries in non-Hodgkins lymphoma, particularly his early career introduction of the disease category concept of Cutaneous T Cell Lymphoma (CTCL), and his discovery of extracorporeal photochemotherapy (ECP) as an immunotherapy for cancer, transplant reactions and autoimmunity.

== Early life and education ==
Richard Edelson grew up in New Jersey, where his father ran a dermatology practice. Edelson graduated from Hamilton College with an undergraduate degree in Chemistry, before earning his MD at the Yale School of Medicine in 1970. Following his graduation, at the height of the Vietnam War, Edelson applied to perform research at the National Institutes of Health (NIH), and, as formally part of the Navy, fulfilled the mandatory military service obligation. These positions combined “highly specialized clinical care with advanced scientific research” according to Yale Medical School. He then was further trained in Internal Medicine at the University of Chicago and Dermatology at Harvard.

== Early career ==
When at the NIH, he was assigned to the National Cancer Institute, from 1972 to 1975, where he held the rank of Lieutenant Commander and simultaneously was an immunology research fellow at the National Cancer Institute and was in charge of lymphoma patients. Here he discovered that lymphoma with prominent skin involvement was commonly a special kind of cancer, which he entitled ‘cutaneous T-cell lymphoma” or CTCL. He next became an assistant professor of dermatology at Columbia College of Physicians and Surgeons. Edelson credits his time at NCI for inspiring him to pursue a career in cancer immunology, while studying early T cell biology. He became a full professor at Columbia in 1980.

While at Columbia, he served as Director of the Immunobiology Group in Columbia University's nationally designated Comprehensive Cancer Center. In 1982 he invented the photopheresis treatment of CTCL. The process drained blood from the patient using an IV, in order to use the photoactivated DNA-crosslinking drug methoxsalen outside of the body in order to kill cancer cells before returning the blood into the patient’s body. Initially, he believed that this would be a stalling tactic for the cancer’s growth, however it cured two of the first five patients of their condition after just three sessions. In the long run, this led to his team’s discovery of the process where the body signals monocytes to become dendritic cells, the master switch of the selective human immune system. In 1988 Edelson’s invention, became the first immunotherapy for any cancer to be approved by the FDA. He also served as Associate Director of Columbia's General Clinical Research Center and Professor and Director of Research in Columbia's Dermatology Department.

In 1986 he was recruited by a national search committee to return to the Yale School of Medicine as Tenured Professor and Chairman of the Yale Department of Dermatology. He held that position for 37 years until 2022, completing one of the longest departmental chairmanships in the history of Yale University. While remaining a full-time Yale faculty member, he elected to relinquish his major administrative responsibilities to focus on his research team's efforts to extend his career-long efforts to produce T cell-based individualized cancer vaccines for the treatment of a broad range of immunogenic malignancies, permissive control of transplanted organs (heart, lung, liver and kidneys), as well as autoimmune disorders (lupus, scleroderma, rheumatoid arthritis, diabetes and blood dyscrasias).

== Yale career ==
While department chair, Edelson also served in two other Yale leadership positions - Director of the Yale Cancer Center, between 2003 and 2008 and Deputy Dean of Yale School of Medicine from 2000 to 2003, overseeing all clinical departments. As Cancer Center Director he secured a renewed grant from the National Cancer Institute for $1.87 million annually, which has designated the Yale Cancer Center the only Comprehensive Cancer Center in southern New England as of the end of his tenure. He also oversaw the building of the new cancer hospital and restructured the Cancer Center’s integration of clinical care and scientific inquiry. In 2008, he was named the first Lerner Professor of Dermatology. As a mentor, sixteen of his physician trainees have gone on to lead Dermatology departments at US medical schools and abroad, including at leading departments at Yale, Harvard, Stanford, NYU and Oregon.

== Research ==
Five innovations define his investigative career. He discovered a cancer, elucidated its biology, originated a worldwide immunotherapy for it, led the team that found the key cell responsible for the efficacy of that therapy and directed advancing efforts to apply the derived principles to the development of personalized therapies for cancer and autoimmunity on a broad disease scale. As a researcher Edelson developed the ECP treatment for cutaneous T-cell lymphoma during the 1980s. Much of his research during this time focused on looking to a patient's own immune system for therapeutics for different forms of cancer. This led to the first FDA-approved immunotherapy for cancer. Part of his discovery was that ECP's induction of dendritic antigen presenting cells (DC) is ECP's therapeutic link with the normal immune system. From this discovery he also developed the concept of transimmunization, an enhanced form of ECP, and method of potential treatment for leukemias, lymphomas, lung cancer, heart and lung transplantation reactions and graft-versus-host disease following stem cell transplants. This research led to his founding of the company TransImmune AG. He also performed research into the use of photopheresis in cancer treatment, using ultraviolet light. His experiments included partnering with Columbia, the University of California at San Francisco, and the universities of Düsseldorf, Vienna and Pennsylvania. While it had long been recognized by immunologists that dendritic cells (DCs) are the principal initiators of selective immunity and tolerance, the therapeutic potential of DCs had been unrealized due to a lack of knowledge of how these cells are produced by the body, where and when they are needed. The Edelson laboratory program reverse engineered the clinical efficacy of ECP into the discovery that those physiologic DCs (phDCs), which naturally function successfully in experimental animals and humans, are produced by controllable and tunable platelet signaling of monocyte-to-dendritic cell maturation. The broad therapeutic implications of this discovery are now being developed by a partnership between Yale University, the Federal Government, the Gates Foundation, and Transimmune AG.

In 2023 Edelson’s became the co-principal investigator on the first ever grant awarded by the Advanced Research Projects Agency for Health, for the implementation of mRNA vaccines for cancer as a part of the Federal Cancer Moonshot program. The project, entitled “Curing the Uncurable via RNA Encoded Immunogene Tuning”, was a collaboration between his lab at Yale, the University of Georgia, and co-principal investigator Philip Santangelo at Emory University. Part of the project is to enable researchers to program dendritic cells with synthetic mRNA so that the immune system can attack cancer cells while not affecting healthy cells. Edelson has stated that this research is partially a long-term continuation of his early research at NCI. Edelson’s work on controlling emerging microbial infections has been funded by the Gates Foundation.

== Recognition ==
Edelson is an elected fellow of both the American Society for Clinical Investigation and the Association of American Physicians. He is also recipient of the Society of Investigative Dermatology's Rothman Award for Career Contribution, the Castle and Connolly's National Physician of the Year award, the American Skin Association's National Mentorship Award, and the Dermatology Foundation's Discovery Award and the International Society of Cutaneous Lymphoma Lifetime Achievement Award. Of the more than two thousand graduates of the NIH Physician Scientist Training Program, he was one of eight selected physician-scientists whose investigative careers were featured in an eight-hour audiobook, narrated by actor Alan Alda, released by Audible.Com in December 2020, as a tribute to pivotal federally funded scientifically-driven medical advances.
