= Combined photothermal and photodynamic therapy =

Combination cytotoxic phototherapy

Photodynamic/photothermal combination therapy involves the usage of a chemical compound or nanomaterial that, when irradiated at a certain wavelength, converts light energy into reactive oxygen species (ROS) and heat. This has shown to be highly effective in the treatment of skin infections, showing increased wound healing rates and a lower impact on human cell viability than photodynamic (PD) or photothermal (PT) therapies. The compounds involved often employ additional mechanisms of action or side effect reduction mechanisms, further increasing their efficacy.

Phototherapies are minimally invasive, with the primary toxicity issues surrounding phototoxicity and the nonspecific ROS and heat mechanisms of action affecting healthy human cells (albeit in lower amounts than the target cells). In skin wound infections, multiple phototherapeutic approaches have observed increased rates of wound closure over nontreated controls. This is typically due to an upregulation of vascular endothelial growth factor (VEGF) and hypoxia-inducible factor (HIF). Phototherapies are also active against both gram-positive and gram-negative bacteria, with photodynamic therapy having some exceptions.

To apply this technique, a photosensitizer is localized to the wound or tumor site, either topically or intravenously. Once localized, the target area is exposed to a laser of a selected wavelength and intensity for a predetermined irradiation time. The wavelength, localization technique, laser intensity, and irradiation period are determined based on the individual phototherapeutic agent, as these factors can vary greatly from compound to compound. Topical applications may be through the incorporation of the phototherapeutic agent with a hydrogel that will slowly leech the compound into the wound, allowing for a more controlled production of ROS and/or heat.

== Phototherapy Types ==
=== Photodynamic Therapy ===
==== Photosensitizers and approved treatments ====
A photosensitizer is a chemical compound or nanomaterial capable of capturing light energy and using this energy to generate ROS. Currently, there are 6 photosensitizers that are clinically-approved or undergoing clinical trials for the treatment of cancers and 1 approved for the treatment of eye disorders and diseases. Photodynamic therapy (PDT) is also often used for acne treatment as well as various dermatological conditions such as psoriasis, atopic dermatitis, and vitiligo. It is highly unlikely that bacteria would gain resistance to a photosensitizer or PDT treatment, as the photosensitizers can generate ROS within or outside of the target cell, both of which damage the membrane

==== Mechanism of action ====
A photosensitizer generates ROS through one of two processes. Type I involves a redox reaction that results in the creation of superoxides (O_{2}•^{−}), hydroxyl radicals (OH•), and radical peroxides, whereas Type II generates singlet oxygen directly through an electron transfer from the photosensitizer. These ROS go on to nonspecifically damage a variety of cellular components, including proteins, DNA, and lipids as they seek to remove the radical.

==== Limitations ====
Due to the necessity of oxygen for PDT, these treatments do not work as well in hypoxic environments, including in developed tumors and some deep wounds. Dental infections tend to also respond better to photothermal therapy than photodynamic therapy, though both have a strong effect. The efficacy of PDT for antimicrobial usage is limited by the properties of the membrane of the target cell such as the electrical gradient (membrane potential) and lipid composition. Whereas high cell death is observed for Escherichia coli and Staphylococcus aureus, other bacterial species such as Klebsiella pneumoniae and Acinetobacter baumannii tend to see very low impact from PDT due to these factors. This limits potential as a broadband antibiotic, but may also allow for specificity in targeting the pathogenic cells over human and skin microbiome cells.

=== Photothermal Therapy ===
Indocyanine green is an FDA-approved photothermal agent that is primarily used in imaging techniques, but also displays anticancer and antimicrobial activity through photothermal therapy (PTT) treatments. Photothermal agents are active against diseased cells by accumulating in or around target cells, then converting light energy directly to heat, killing the target through heat-related damage.

PTT has a low level of selectivity beyond the accumulation stage, in which it tends to preferentially accumulate within diseased and bacterial cells. This increases broadband antibiotic activity and decreases the likelihood of resistance development, but also raises the impact on human cells. Human cells experience irreversible damage in the range of 46-60 °C, which is below temperatures reached by some photothermal agents during photothermal therapy. Human cell viability may be maintained through low temperature PTT (≤ 45 °C), which is typically only possible in combination with an additional antibiotic or photodynamic activity.

== Combination Therapy - Antibacterial ==
Photodynamic/photothermal combination therapy combines the mechanisms of ROS production and heat generation into one treatment for a heightened effect on the target bacterial cells. In many cases, this can be done with a single compound or nanomaterial (phototherapeutic agent) and wavelength.

=== Advantages over monotherapy ===
==== Increased antibiotic efficacy ====
Due to the presence of both ROS and excess heat, target cells are less able to resist each effect. Increased heat corresponds to heightened cell membrane permeability, allowing the generation of ROS within the target cell. This also removes/reduces the selectivity observed for PDT, as it is able to enter the cell unhindered.

==== Lower side effects ====
Both photosensitizers and photothermal agents have some degree of selectivity for target cells over healthy human cells, but in utilizing both of these mechanisms this selectivity is bolstered. Increased antibiotic efficacy indicates a lower likelihood of requiring follow-up treatments, so the damage is minimal. In addition, some of these combination phototherapeutic agents have antioxidant/reactive oxygen scavenging properties, reducing the amount of collateral damage sustained by the surrounding human cells.

==== Incorporation of tertiary mechanisms ====
Many phototherapeutic agents that display both PD and PT activity come with added effects, such as antibiotic metal ions, physical antibiotic mechanisms, or peroxidase-like activity. These added effects further increase antibiotic activity, often demonstrating broadband activity with 99% cell death or above regardless of strain or drug resistance.
