= Endre Mester =

Hungarian laser therapy physician (1903–1984)

Professor Endre Mester
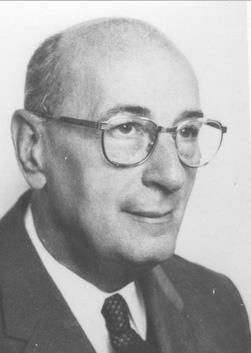
- Born: 1903 November 20; Budapest, Hungary
- Died: 1984
- Citizenship: Austro-Hungarian empire
- Education: University of Pécs
- Occupations: Physician, medical researcher
- Known for: Therapeutic use of lasers
- Spouse: Gini
- Children: Adam, Andrew
- Awards: "Merited and Prominent Physician of the Hungarian People's Republic", "The Golden Order of Labor" (twice; in 1958, and in 1978)

Endre Mester (1903–1984) was a Hungarian physician and pioneer of laser medicine, especially the use of low level laser therapy (LLLT). In 1967, only a few years after the first working laser was invented, he started his experiments with the effects of lasers on skin cancer. He is credited as the discoverer of positive biological effects of low power lasers, which have been advocated as alternative medicine for use in wound healing, smoking cessation, tuberculosis, temporomandibular joint disorders, and musculoskeletal conditions such as carpal tunnel syndrome, fibromyalgia, osteoarthritis, and rheumatoid arthritis. LLLT devices are popular and may bring about temporary relief of some types of pain. As of 2009, a summary from Quackwatch reported medical authorities found no reason to believe LLLT influence the course of any ailment or are more effective for pain control than other forms of heat delivery. Subsequent research has found LLLT may offer benefit in treating several health ailments, including rheumatoid arthritis, osteoarthritis, tendinopathy, and frozen shoulders.

== Biography ==
=== Early life ===
Endre Mester was born on November 20, 1903, in Budapest, Hungary. He studied medicine at University of Pécs, Hungary until 1927. He then taught surgery at the Pazmany Peter University in Budapest, while working with Dr. Lajos Adam. He was certified both in surgery and in radiology.

=== Later career ===
During World War II, Mester worked as a surgeon at Saint John's Hospital and in the "Rock Hospital", located in the tunnels underneath Castle Hill in Budapest.

Mester chaired the Surgery Department of the Bajcsy Zsilinszky Teaching Hospital in Budapest from 1947 until 1963. He publicly welcomed the 1956 Hungarian uprising against Communism yet, when it failed, he was not persecuted because of his important medical work.

In 1963, he became Professor and Department Chair at the Semmelweis Medical University in Budapest, and worked there until his retirement in 1973. In 1971, he received the "Doctor of Sciences" title from the Hungarian Academy of Sciences.

=== Laser research ===
Mester started his laser research in 1965. In 1974 he founded the Laser Research Center at Semmelweis, and continued working there for the remainder of his life.

He is credited with the discovery of low level laser therapy.

Mester's publications on the biostimulatory effects of the low intensity laser started in 1967. He performed early science experiments on the biological effects of laser irradiation. While applying lasers to the backs of shaven mice, Mester noticed that the shaved hair grew back more quickly on the treated group than the untreated group. Mester is believed to be only the fourth physician publishing in the area of laser medicine and surgery.

In 1971, he began treating patients with non-healing skin ulcers, while using Low Intensity Laser Irradiation.

Mester is the author of over 100 published articles in his areas of research. His two sons, Adam Mester, M.D. a radiologist, and Andrew Mester, M.D., an otolaryngologist, later assisted him in his work.

== Professional positions ==
- President of the Hungarian Society of Surgeons (for 8 years)
- President of the International Soft Laser Society
- Vice President of the Red Cross Committee of Budapest
