= Light therapy =

Therapy involving intentional exposure to sunlight

Phototherapy
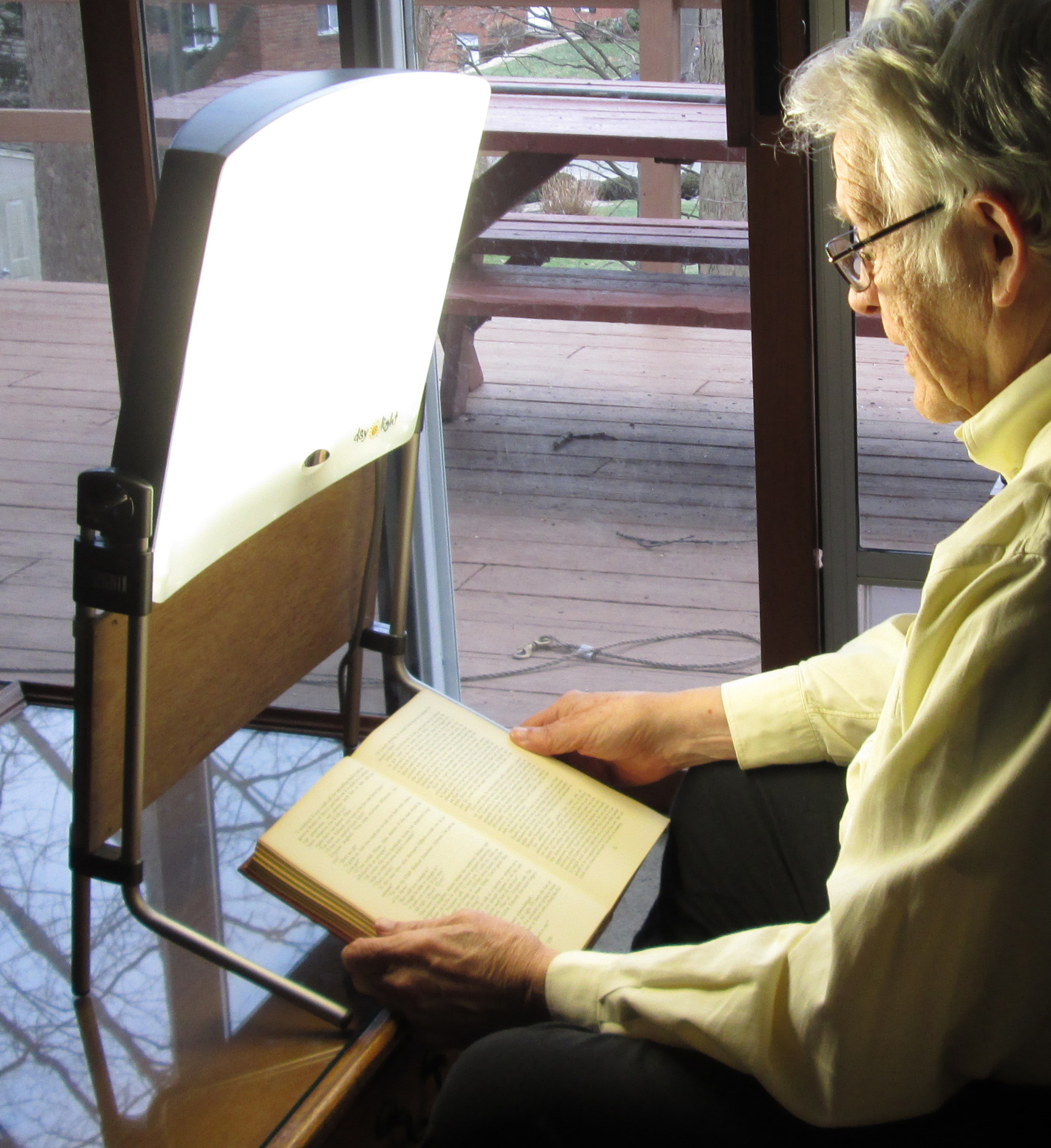
- Example of light therapy for winter depression
- ICD-10-PCS: 6A6, GZJ
- ICD-9: 99.83, 99.88
- MeSH: D010789

Phototherapy is the exposure to direct sunlight or artificial light at controlled wavelengths in order to treat a variety of medical disorders.

Light therapy, also called bright light therapy, is the use of bright visible light to treat seasonal affective disorder (SAD) and circadian rhythm sleep-wake disorders. Treating skin conditions such as neurodermatitis, psoriasis, acne vulgaris, and eczema with ultraviolet light is called ultraviolet light therapy. Other forms of treatment target cancers, neonatal jaundice, and skin wound infections.

== Medical uses ==
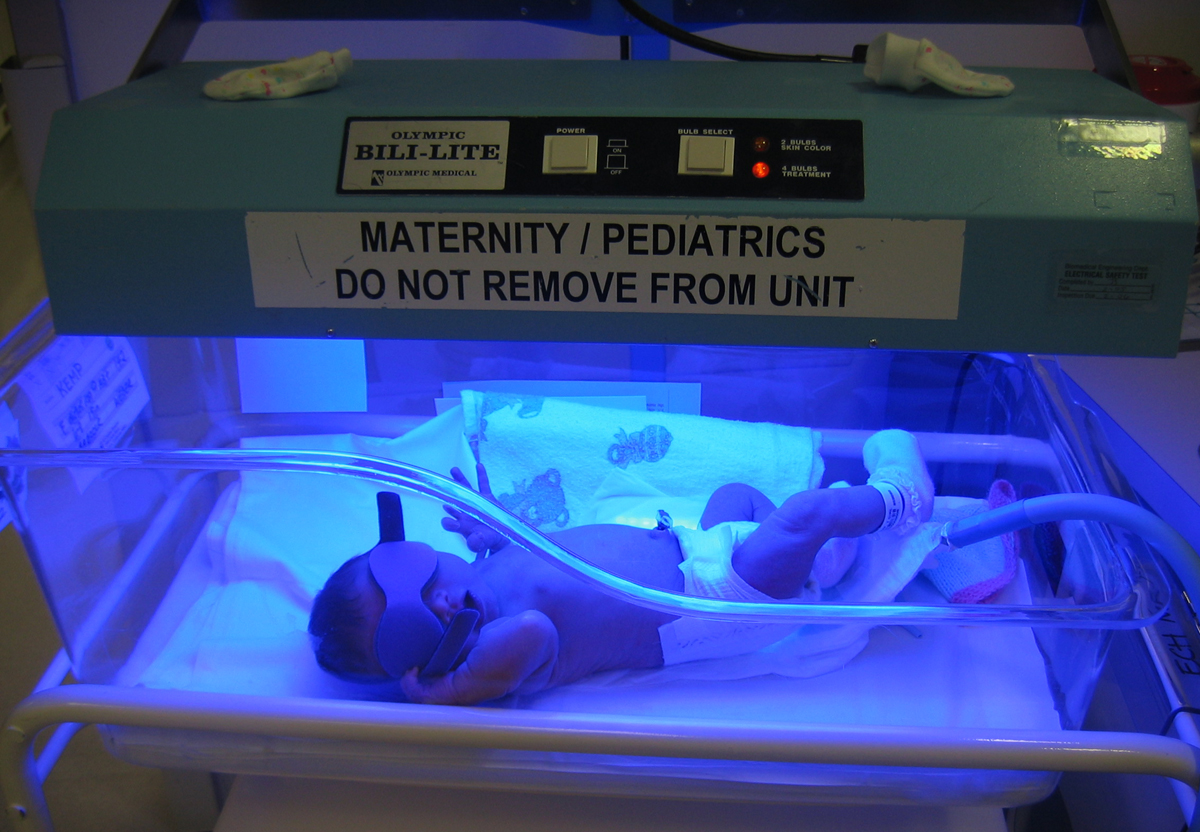
A baby in neonatal care under a blue-light (420–470 nm) phototherapy lamp wearing only a diaper, being treated for newborn jaundice (hyperbilirubinemia)

=== Nutrient deficiency ===
==== Vitamin D deficiency ====
Exposure to UV-B light at wavelengths of 290–300 nanometers enables the body to produce vitamin D3 to treat vitamin D3 deficiency.

=== Skin conditions ===
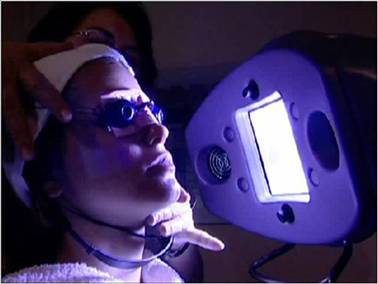
High-intensity blue light (425 nm) used for the attempted treatment of acne

Light therapy treatments for the skin usually involve exposure to ultraviolet light. The exposures can be to a small area of the skin or over the whole body surface, as in a tanning bed. The most common treatment is with narrowband UVB, which has a wavelength of approximately 311–313 nanometers. Full body phototherapy can be delivered at a doctor's office or at home using a large high-power UVB booth. Tanning beds, however, generate mostly UVA light, and only 4% to 10% of tanning-bed light is in the UVB spectrum.

==== Acne vulgaris ====
As of 2012, evidence for light therapy and lasers in the treatment of acne vulgaris was not sufficient to recommend them. There is moderate evidence for the efficacy of blue and blue-red light therapies in treating mild acne, but most studies are of low quality. While light therapy appears to provide short-term benefit, there is a lack of long-term outcome data in those with severe acne.

==== Atopic dermatitis ====
Light therapy is considered one of the best monotherapy treatments for atopic dermatitis (AD) when applied to patients who have not responded to traditional topical treatments. The therapy offers a wide range of options: UVA1 for acute AD, NB-UVB for chronic AD, and balneophototherapy have proven their efficacy. Patients tolerate the therapy safely but, as in any therapy, there are potential adverse effects and care must be taken in its application, particularly to children. According to a study involving 21 adults with severe atopic dermatitis, narrowband UVB phototherapy administered three times per week for 12 weeks reduced atopic dermatitis severity scores by 68%. In this open study, 15 patients still experienced long-term benefits six months later.

==== Cancer ====
According to the American Cancer Society, there is some evidence that ultraviolet light therapy may be effective in helping treat certain kinds of skin cancer, and ultraviolet blood irradiation therapy is established for this application. However, alternative uses of light for cancer treatment – light box therapy and colored light therapy – are not supported by evidence. Photodynamic therapy (often with red light) is used to treat certain superficial non-melanoma skin cancers.

==== Psoriasis ====
For psoriasis, UVB phototherapy has been shown to be effective. A feature of psoriasis is localized inflammation mediated by the immune system. Ultraviolet radiation is known to suppress the immune system and reduce inflammatory responses. Light therapy for skin conditions like psoriasis usually use 313 nanometer UVB though it may use UVA (315–400 nm wavelength) or a broader spectrum UVB (280–315 nm wavelength). UVA combined with psoralen, a drug taken orally, is known as PUVA treatment. In UVB phototherapy the exposure time is very short, seconds to minutes depending on intensity of lamps and the person's skin pigment and sensitivity.

==== Vitiligo ====
About 1% of the human population has vitiligo which causes painless distinct light-colored patches of the skin on the face, hands, and legs. Phototherapy is an effective treatment because it forces skin cells to manufacture melanin to protect the body from UV damage. Prescribed treatment is generally 3 times a week in a clinic or daily at home. About 1 month usually results in re-pigmentation in the face and neck, and 2–4 months in the hands and legs. Narrowband UVB is more suitable to the face and neck and PUVA is more effective at the hands and legs.

==== Other skin conditions ====
Some types of phototherapy may be effective in the treatment of polymorphous light eruption, cutaneous T-cell lymphoma and lichen planus. Narrowband UVB between 311 and 313 nanometers is the most common treatment.

=== Retinal conditions ===
There is preliminary evidence that light therapy is an effective treatment for diabetic retinopathy and diabetic macular oedema.

=== Mood and sleep related ===
==== Seasonal affective disorder ====
The effectiveness of light therapy for treating seasonal affective disorder (SAD) may be linked to reduced sunlight exposure in the winter months. Light resets the body's internal clock. Studies show that light therapy helps reduce the debilitating depressive symptoms of SAD, such as excessive sleepiness and fatigue, with results lasting for at least 1 month. Light therapy is preferred over antidepressants in the treatment of SAD because it is a relatively safe and easy therapy with minimal side effects. Two methods of light therapy, bright light and dawn simulation, have similar success rates in the treatment of SAD.

It is possible that response to light therapy for SAD could be season dependent. Morning therapy has provided the best results because light in the early morning aids in regulating the circadian rhythm. People affected by SAD often have low energy, tend to eat more carbohydrates and sleep longer, but symptoms can vary between people.

A Cochrane review conducted in 2019 states the evidence that light therapy's effectiveness as a treatment for the prevention of seasonal affective disorder is limited, although the risk of adverse effects are minimal. Therefore, the decision to use light therapy should be based on a person's preference of treatment.

==== Non-seasonal depression ====
Light therapy has also been suggested in the treatment of non-seasonal depression and other psychiatric mood disturbances, including major depressive disorder, bipolar disorder and postpartum depression. A meta-analysis by the Cochrane Collaboration concluded that "for patients suffering from non-seasonal depression, light therapy offers modest though promising antidepressive efficacy." A 2008 systematic review concluded that "overall, bright light therapy is an excellent candidate for inclusion into the therapeutic inventory available for the treatment of nonseasonal depression today, as adjuvant therapy to antidepressant medication, or eventually as stand-alone treatment for specific subgroups of depressed patients." A 2015 review found that supporting evidence for light therapy was limited due to serious methodological flaws.

A 2016 meta-analysis showed that bright light therapy appeared to be efficacious, particularly when administered for 2–5 weeks' duration and as monotherapy.

==== Chronic circadian rhythm sleep disorders (CRSD) ====
In the management of circadian rhythm disorders such as delayed sleep phase disorder (DSPD), the timing of light exposure is critical. Light exposure administered to the eyes before or after the nadir of the core body temperature rhythm can affect the phase response curve. Use upon awakening may also be effective for non-24-hour sleep–wake disorder. Some users have reported success with lights that turn on shortly before awakening (dawn simulation). Evening use is recommended for people with advanced sleep phase disorder. Some, but not all, totally blind people whose retinae are intact, may benefit from light therapy.

==== Circadian rhythm sleep disorders and jet lag ====
===== Situational CRSD =====
Light therapy has been tested for individuals with shift work sleep disorder and for jet lag.

===== Sleep disorder in Parkinson's disease =====
Light therapy has been trialed in treating sleep disorders experienced by patients with Parkinson's disease.

===== Sleep disorder in Alzheimer's disease =====
Studies have shown that daytime and evening light therapy for nursing home patients with Alzheimer's disease, who often struggle with agitation and fragmented wake/rest cycles effectively led to more consolidated sleep and an increase in circadian rhythm stability.

=== Neonatal jaundice (postnatal jaundice) ===
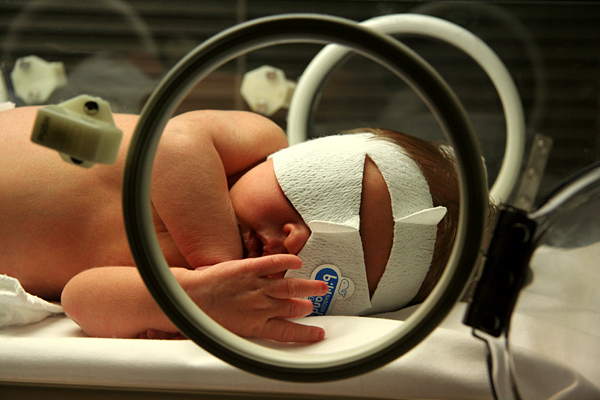
A newborn infant undergoing white-light phototherapy to treat neonatal jaundice

Light therapy is used to treat cases of neonatal jaundice. Bilirubin, a yellow pigment normally formed in the liver during the breakdown of old red blood cells, cannot always be effectively cleared by a neonate's liver causing neonatal jaundice. Accumulation of excess bilirubin can cause central nervous system damage, and so this buildup of bilirubin must be treated. Phototherapy uses the energy from light to isomerize the bilirubin and consequently transform it into compounds that the newborn can excrete via urine and stools. Bilirubin is most successful absorbing light in the blue region of the visible light spectrum, which falls between 460 and 490 nm. Therefore, light therapy technologies that utilize these blue wavelengths are the most successful at isomerizing bilirubin.

== Techniques ==
=== Photodynamic therapy ===
Photodynamic therapy (PDT) is a form of phototherapy using nontoxic light-sensitive compounds (photosensitizers) that are exposed selectively to light at a controlled wavelength, laser intensity, and irradiation time, whereupon they generate toxic reactive oxygen species (ROS) that target malignant and other diseased cells. Oxygen is thus required for activity, lowering efficacy in highly developed tumors and other hypoxic environments. Selective apoptosis of diseased cells is difficult due to the radical nature of ROS, but may be controlled for through membrane potential and other cell-type specific properties' effects on permeability or through photoimmunotherapy. In developing any phototherapeutic agent, the phototoxicity of the treatment wavelength should be considered.

==== Photodynamic cancer therapy ====
Various cancer treatments utilizing PDT have been approved by the FDA. Treatments are available for actinic keratosis (blue light with aminolevulinic acid), cutaneous T-cell lymphoma, Barrett esophagus, basal cell skin cancer, esophageal cancer, non-small cell lung cancer, and squamous cell skin cancer (Stage 0). Photosensitizing agents clinically-approved or undergoing clinical trials for the treatment of cancers include Photofrin, Temoporfin, Motexafin lutetium, Palladium bacteriopheophorbide, Purlytin, and Talaporfin. Verteporfin is approved to treat eye conditions such as macular degeneration, myopia, and ocular histoplasmosis. Third-generation photosensitizers are currently in development, but none are yet approved for clinical trials.

==== Antimicrobial photodynamic therapy ====
PDT may also be utilized to treat multidrug-resistant skin, wound, or other superficial infections. This is known as antimicrobial photodynamic therapy (aPDT) or photodynamic inactivation (PDI). aPDT has been observed to be effective against both gram-positive and gram-negative bacteria such as Escherichia coli, Staphylococcus aureus, Pseudomonas aeruginosa, and Mycobacterium. aPDT has shown lowered efficacy on some other bacterial species, such as Klebsiella pneumoniae and Acinetobacter baumannii. This is likely due to factors such as cell wall thickness and membrane potential. Many studies utilizing aPDT focus on the application of the photosensitizer through leakage from a hydrogel, which has been found to increase wound healing speed of skin infections through the upregulation of vascular endothelial growth factor (VEGF) and hypoxia inducible factor (HIF). This controlled leakage allows for prolonged but limited generation of ROS, lowering the impact on human cell viability due to ROS cytotoxicity. It is unlikely for drug resistance to photosensitizers to form due to the nontoxic nature of the photosensitizer itself as well as the ROS generation mechanism of action, which cannot be prevented outside of hypoxic environments. Certain dental infections (peri-implantitis, periodontitis) are more difficult to treat with PDT as opposed to photothermal therapy due to the requirement of oxygen, though a significant response is still observed.

Increased antimicrobial activity and wound healing speeds are typically observed when PDT is combined with photothermal therapy in photodynamic/photothermal combination therapy.

=== Photothermal Therapy ===
Photothermal therapy (PTT) is a form of phototherapy that uses non-toxic compounds called photothermal agents (PTA) that, when irradiated at a certain wavelength of light, converts the light energy directly to heat energy. The photothermal conversion efficiency determines the amount of light converted to heat, which can dictate the necessary irradiation time and/or laser intensity for treatments. Typically PTT treatments use wavelengths in the near-infrared (NIR) spectra, which can be further divided into NIR-I (760-900 nm), NIR-II (900-1880 nm), and NIR-III (2080-2340 nm) windows. Wavelengths in these regions are typically less phototoxic than UV or high-energy visible light. In addition, NIR-II wavelengths have been observed to show deeper penetration than NIR-I wavelengths, allowing for treatment of deeper wounds, infections, and cancers. Important considerations for the development of a PTA include photothermal conversion efficiency, phototoxicity, laser intensity, irradiation time, and the temperature at which human cell viability is impaired (around 46-60 °C). Currently, the only FDA-approved photothermal agent is indocyanine green which is active against both tumor and bacterial cells.

PTT is less selective than photodynamic therapy (PDT, see above) due to its heat-based mechanism of action, but also less likely to promote drug resistance than most, if not all, currently developed treatments. In addition, PTT can be used in hypoxic environments and on deeper wounds, infections, and tumors than PDT due to the higher wavelength of light. Due to PTT activity in hypoxic environments, it may be also used on more developed tumors than PDT. Low-temperature PTT (≤ 45 °C) for treatment of infections is also a possibility when combined with an antibiotic compound due to heat's proportionality with membrane permeability - a hotter environment causes heightened membrane permeability, which thus allows the drug into the cell. This would reduce/eliminate the impact on human cell viability, and aiding in antibiotic accumulation within the target cell may assist in restoring activity in antibiotics that pathogens had developed resistance to.

PTT is typically seen to have improved antimicrobial and wound healing activity when combined with an additional mechanism of action through PDT or added antibiotic compounds in the application.

=== Light boxes ===
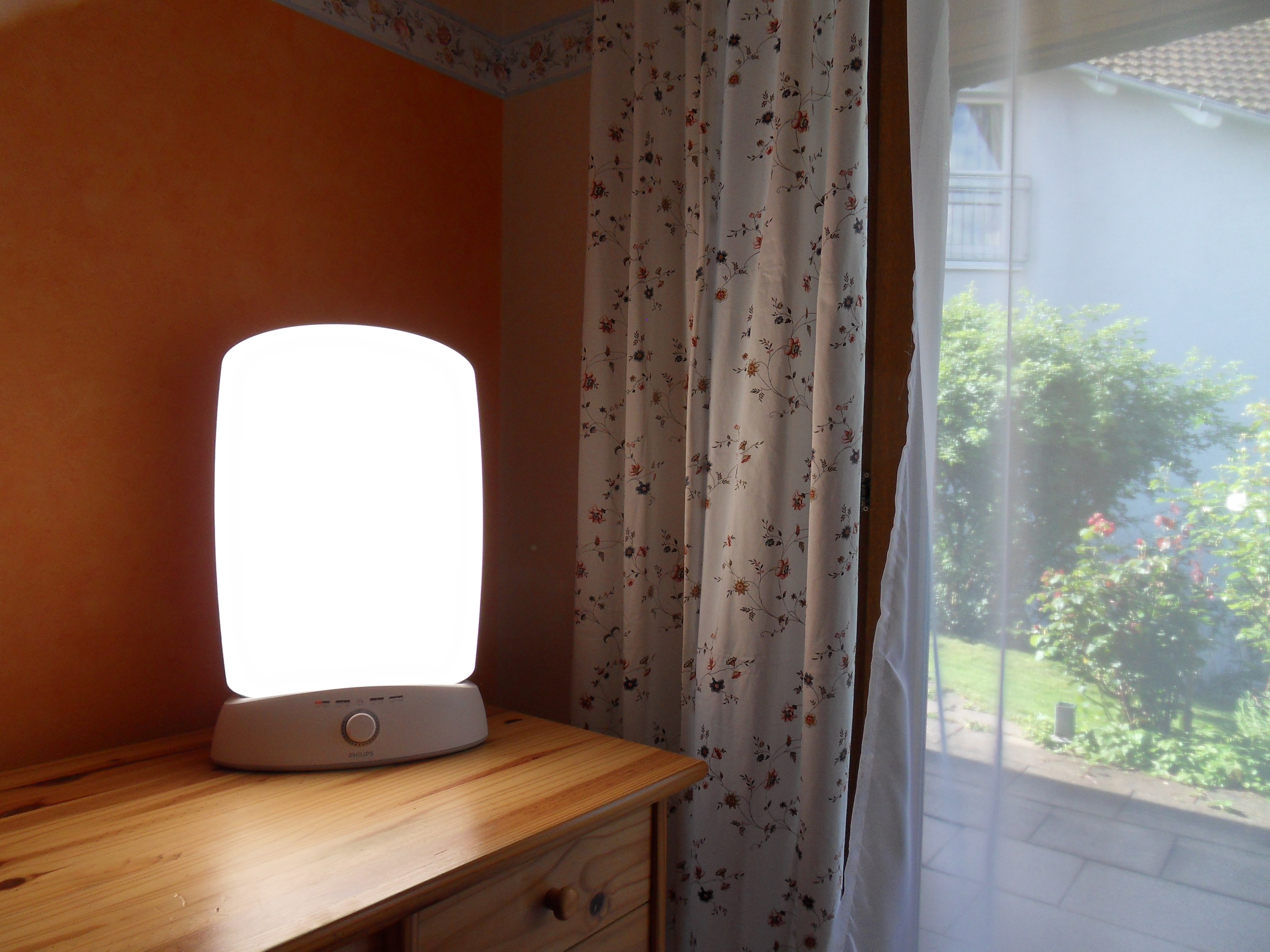
Light intensity of a light therapy lamp in a room. Daylight only penetrates into the room filtered and restricted from the window curtain and protruding roof. In modern society, people often spend too little time outdoors, where the light is significantly brighter than in closed rooms.

The production of the hormone melatonin, a sleep regulator, is inhibited by light and permitted by darkness as registered by photosensitive ganglion cells in the retina. To some degree, the reverse is true for serotonin, which has been linked to mood disorders. Hence, for the purpose of manipulating melatonin levels or timing, light boxes providing very specific types of artificial illumination to the retina of the eye are effective.

Light therapy uses either a light box which emits up to 10,000 lux of light at a specified distance, (Note: Lux measures the amount of illumination in a square meter. The distance affects how much area the light is spread over.) much brighter than a customary lamp, or a lower intensity of specific wavelengths of light from the blue (460 nm) to the green (525 nm) areas of the visible spectrum. A 1995 study showed that green light therapy at doses of 350 lux produces melatonin suppression and phase shifts equivalent to 10,000 lux white light therapy, but another study published in May 2010 suggests that the blue light often used for SAD treatment should perhaps be replaced by green or white illumination, because of a possible involvement of the cones in melatonin suppression.

== Risks and complications ==
=== Ultraviolet ===
Ultraviolet light causes progressive damage to human skin and erythema even from small doses. This is mediated by genetic damage, collagen damage, as well as destruction of vitamin A and vitamin C in the skin and free radical generation. Ultraviolet light is also known to be a factor in formation of cataracts. Ultraviolet radiation exposure is strongly linked to incidence of skin cancer.

=== Visible light ===
Optical radiation of any kind with enough intensity can cause damage to the eyes and skin including photoconjunctivitis and photokeratitis. Researchers have questioned whether limiting blue light exposure could reduce the risk of age-related macular degeneration. According to the American Academy of Ophthalmology, there is no scientific evidence showing that exposure to blue light emitting devices result in eye damage. According to Harriet Hall, blue light exposure is reported to suppress the production of melatonin, which affects our body's circadian rhythm and can decrease sleep quality. It is reported that, in reproductive-age females, bright light therapy may activate the production of reproductive hormones, such as luteinizing hormone, follicle-stimulating hormone, and estradiol

Modern phototherapy lamps used in the treatment of seasonal affective disorder and sleep disorders either filter out or do not emit ultraviolet light and are considered safe and effective for the intended purpose, as long as photosensitizing drugs are not being taken at the same time and in the absence of any existing eye conditions. Light therapy is a mood altering treatment, and just as with drug treatments, there is a possibility of triggering a manic state from a depressive state, causing anxiety and other side effects. While these side effects are usually controllable, it is recommended that patients undertake light therapy under the supervision of an experienced clinician, rather than attempting to self-medicate.

Contraindications to light therapy for seasonal affective disorder include conditions that might render the eyes more vulnerable to phototoxicity, tendency toward mania, photosensitive skin conditions, or use of a photosensitizing herb (such as St. John's wort) or medication. Patients with porphyria should avoid most forms of light therapy. Patients on certain drugs such as methotrexate or chloroquine should use caution with light therapy as there is a chance that these drugs could cause porphyria.

Side effects of light therapy for sleep phase disorders include jumpiness or jitteriness, headache, eye irritation and nausea. Some non-depressive physical complaints, such as poor vision and skin rash or irritation, may improve with light therapy.

== History ==
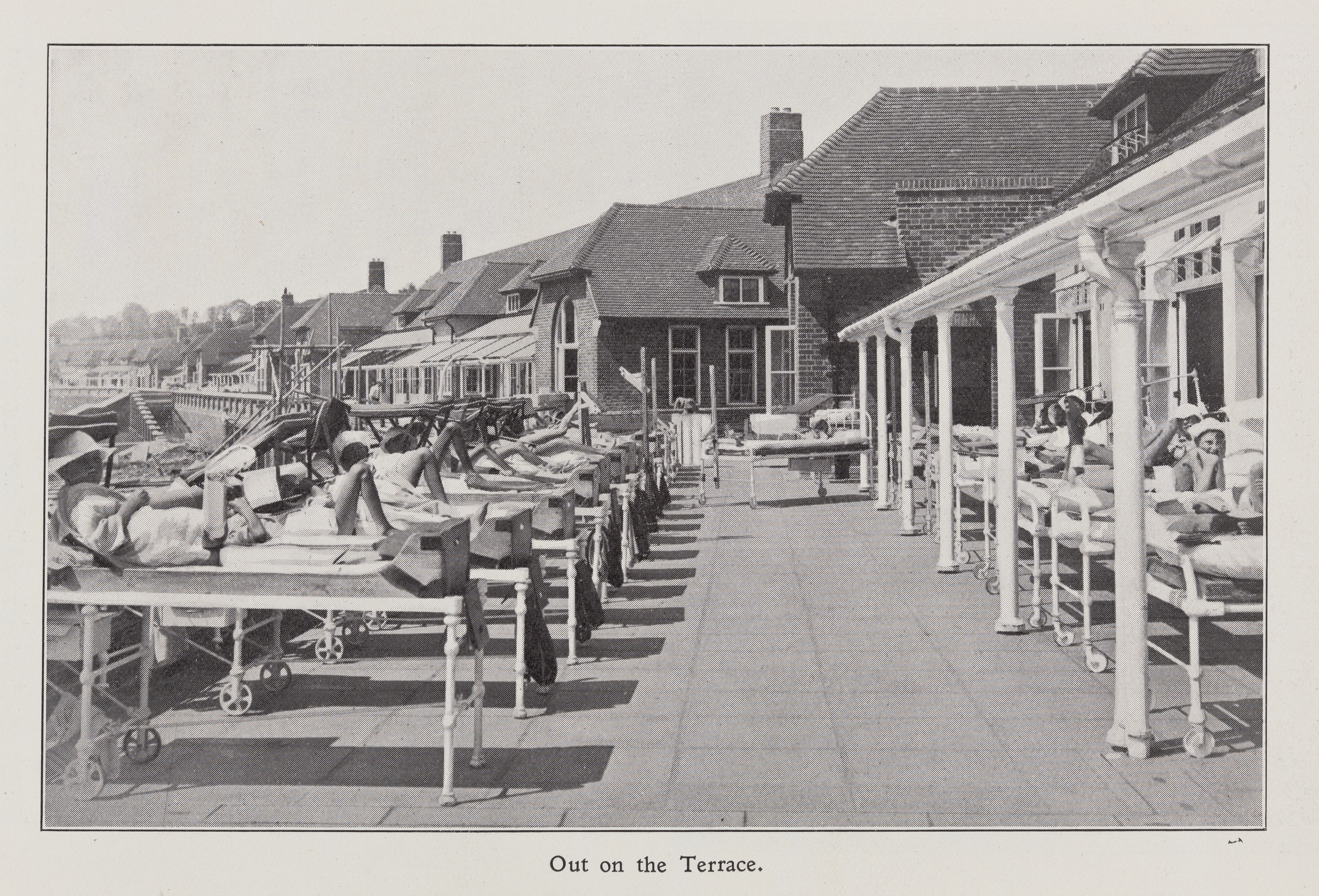
Child patients with external forms of tuberculosis, especially of the bones and joints, lying on beds on a terrace outside Treloar Hospital in Alton, Hampshire, England, in sunlight as part of their light therapy, ca. first half of the 20th century

Many ancient cultures practiced various forms of heliotherapy, including people of Ancient Greece, Ancient Egypt, and Ancient Rome. The Inca, Assyrian and early Germanic peoples also worshipped the sun as a health bringing deity. Indian medical literature dating to 1500 BCE describes a treatment combining herbs with natural sunlight to treat non-pigmented skin areas. Buddhist literature from about 200 CE and 10th-century Chinese documents make similar references.

The Faroese physician Niels Finsen is believed to be the father of modern phototherapy. He developed the first artificial light source for this purpose. Finsen used short wavelength light to treat lupus vulgaris, a skin infection caused by Mycobacterium tuberculosis. He thought that the beneficial effect was due to ultraviolet light killing the bacteria, but recent studies showed that his lens and filter system did not allow such short wavelengths to pass through, leading instead to the conclusion that light of approximately 400 nanometers generated reactive oxygen that would kill the bacteria. Finsen also used red light to treat smallpox lesions. He received the Nobel Prize in Physiology or Medicine in 1903. Scientific evidence for some of his treatments is lacking, and later eradication of smallpox and development of antibiotics for tuberculosis rendered light therapy obsolete for these diseases. In the early 20th-century light therapy was promoted by Auguste Rollier and John Harvey Kellogg. In 1924, Caleb Saleeby founded The Sunlight League.

From the late nineteenth century until the early 1930s, light therapy was considered an effective and mainstream medical therapy in the UK for conditions such as varicose ulcer, 'sickly children' and a wide range of other conditions. Controlled trials by the medical scientist Dora Colebrook, supported by the Medical Research Council, indicated that light therapy was not effective for such a wide range of conditions.

== Controversy ==
Red light therapy involves exposure to low levels of red light or near-infrared light, typically through lamps or masks. It is promoted for various skin-related benefits, including improved appearance and reduced signed of aging. However, as of 2021 there is insufficient scientific evidence to support many of these claims. There has been some indication that it may reduce inflammation associated with conditions such as acne or rosacea, but evidence supporting its anti-aging effects remain limited. Most existing research has focused on in-office treatments, while at-home devices are generally less powerful and precise, which may lead to inconsistent results. It is generally considered safe, however if misused red light therapy could cause eye or skin damage.

== See also ==
- Blood irradiation therapy
- Chromotherapy
- Crib A'Glow
- Free-running sleep
- Low level laser therapy
- Neuromodulation
- Neurostimulation
- Neurotechnology
- Photodynamic therapy
- Sun tanning
- UV-B lamps
