= American Business Council Nigeria =

Non profit organization

- Founded: 2005
- Purpose: International Trade
- Location: Lagos
- Key people: Margaret Olele (Executive Secretary/CEO); Nneka Enwereji (President)
- Website: http://www.abcnig.com/

The American Business Council Nigeria (ABCN) is a non-profit, non-partisan, issues-oriented business organization that provides the private sector's perspective in the Nigeria-U.S. relationship and an affiliate of the U.S. Chamber of Commerce in Nigeria incorporated in February 2007. The council currently consists of over 100 members with Nneka Enwereji as the President and Margaret Olele as the chief executive officer.

== Board of directors ==
The following companies are represented on the ABCN Board of Directors.

- Citibank Nigeria
- PWC
- Capital Alliance
- Verraki Nigeria
- KPMG
- Technology Software
- ExxonnMobil
- Coca-Cola
- Dubri Oil
- Dow Chemical
- Microsoft
- Schlumberger
- Hewlett Packard Enterprise (HP)
- Visa
- General Electric (GE)

== Influence ==
The American Business Council Nigeria has participated in several conversations surrounding Nigeria's business and regulatory environment, including issues relating to Nigeria's ever changing digital economy. In August 2021, Sahara Reporters published an article acknowledging concerns made by the Council regarding the provisions of the proposed National Information Technology Development Agency (NITDA) bill, with extensive focus on its licensing framework, regulatory jurisdiction and the planned levies on businesses. The Council made disputes to the report and clarified that they had not engaged the media on the matter and that the report does not reflect the positions of the Council.

The U.S. Mission Nigeria has actively partnered with the American Business Council Nigeria to advance bilateral trade, private sector investment and economic reforms across multiple sectors such as Energy, Technology, agriculture, and financial services. Most Notably, the U.S. Mission Nigeria partnered with the Council with the launch of its Freedom 250 program.
