= Low-level laser therapy =

Treatment using irradiation with light of low power intensity

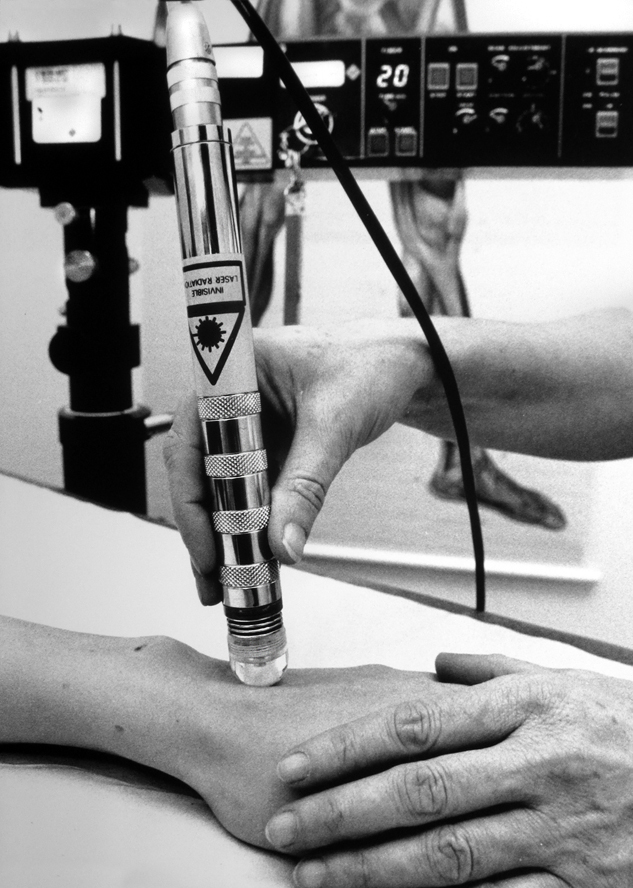
- LLLT being applied for rheumatism in Sweden
- MeSH: D028022

Low-level laser therapy (LLLT), cold laser therapy, or photobiomodulation (PBM) is a photochemical reaction-based medical treatment that applies low-level (low-power) lasers or light-emitting diodes (LEDs) to the surface of the body without damaging tissue. Proponents claim that this treatment stimulates healing, relieves pain, and enhances cell function. Sometimes termed as low-level red-light therapy (LLRL), its effects appear to be limited to a specific range of wavelengths. Its effectiveness is under investigation. Several such devices are cleared by the United States Food and Drug Administration (FDA). The therapy may be effective for conditions such as juvenile myopia, rheumatoid arthritis, and oral mucositis.

== Mechanism ==
LLLT uses lasers, LEDs, or a combination of both to alter biological activity. The light sources expose cells to low levels of red and near infrared light (compared to other forms of laser therapy).

LLLT is subject to the Grotthuss-Draper law, the first law in photochemistry: light must be absorbed by a chemical substance in order for a photochemical reaction to take place. In the generally accepted LLLT theory that chemical substance is represented by the respiratory enzyme cytochrome c oxidase, which is involved in the electron transport chain in mitochondria. Administering LLLT below the dose range does not appear to be effective.

== Applications ==
=== Human use ===
==== Musculoskeletal conditions ====
LLLT has been studied for use in treatment of musculoskeletal conditions, including:

- osteoarthritis
- rheumatoid arthritis
- temporomandibular joint disorders
- chronic low back pain
- neck pain
- tendinopathy
- chronic joint disorders.

==== Other ====
- wound healing
- smoking cessation
- tuberculosis.
- periodontal disease

==== Prevention ====
LLLT appears to be effective for preventing:

- oral mucositis in recipients of a stem cell transplant with chemotherapy

=== Brain stimulation ===
Transcranial low level light therapy (or transcranial photobiomodulation) is limited in neuromodulation by several factors:

- Excessive radiation can be harmful. Therefore, dosing must be strictly controlled to achieve growth stimulation, while avoiding excessive singlet oxygen that may be harmful to cells.
- LED stimulation cannot pass through the skin, only laser light can penetrate deeper tissues and stimulate brain areas. The penetration depth of white and LED light into the skin increases with increasing wavelength from the ultraviolet to the visible light range, and then decreases again in the infrared range. This depth increases if the thickness of the stratum corneum decreases. White light and LED radiation can only penetrate 0.0017 mm to 5 mm of tissue. At wavelengths of 450 nm and 650 nm only 1% of the light reaches approximately 1.6 mm and very little reaches 5 mm.
- The action spectrum for tissue regeneration and repair consist of more than one wavelength, such that laser and LED light sources may offer some disadvantages, possibly destroying healthy cells. Links between neuronal activity and mental processes are still research questions as is whether the laser reaches only the neuronal structures that benefit from treatment.

Insufficient information from clinical trials compares the effectiveness of different types of devices or device parameters (wavelengths, power output, session time, area of actuation).

=== Veterinary use ===
Veterinary clinics use cold laser devices to treat a wide variety of ailments, from arthritis to wounds, on dogs and cats. In spite of this, little research has been done on its effects. According to Brennen McKenzie, president of the Evidence-Based Veterinary Medicine Association, as of 2016 "research into cold laser in dogs and cats is sparse and generally low quality. Most studies are small and have minimal or uncertain controls for bias and error". He allowed that some studies show promising results, while concluding that current evidence is not sufficient to support routine clinical use.

== Contraindications ==
Based on the results of a systematic review, there is no evidence to suggest that people with cancer or people who are at risk of getting cancer should avoid photobiomodulation.

== Side effects ==
There are some reports of mild pain or skin irritation after red-light therapy. The long-term effects on the skin or the hair are not known. Eye protection is suggested for some devices. For skin applications, different wavelengths of light may result in different biological effects depending on the person's skin type, race, and ethnicity. Clinical guidelines suggest that a dermatologist be consulted before undergoing treatment.

For safety, use should be limited to a device approved for human use by the relevant government authority; for example, in the US, it is suggested that only devices certified by the FDA for dermatologic application be used.

== History ==
Faroese physician Niels Finsen is believed to be the father of modern light therapy. He used red light to treat smallpox lesions. He received the Nobel Prize in Physiology or Medicine in 1903. Scientific evidence for some of his treatments is lacking, and later eradication of smallpox and development of antibiotics for tuberculosis rendered light therapy obsolete for these diseases.

Hungarian physician and surgeon Endre Mester (1903–1984) is credited with the discovery of the biological effects of low power lasers, which occurred a few years after the 1960 invention of the ruby laser and the 1961 invention of the helium–neon (HeNe) laser. Mester accidentally discovered that low-level ruby laser light could regrow hair during an attempt to replicate an experiment that showed that such lasers could reduce tumors in mice. The laser he was using was faulty and was not as powerful as believed. It failed to affect the tumors, but in places where the mice had been shaved in order to do the experiments, the hair grew back more quickly on the treated mice than on those among the control group. He published those results in 1967. Mester went on to show that low level HeNe light could accelerate wound healing in mice.

By the 1970s, he was applying low level laser light to treat people with skin ulcers. In 1974, he founded the Laser Research Center at the Semmelweis Medical University in Budapest, and continued working there for the remainder of his life. His sons carried on his work and brought it to the United States.

By 1987, companies selling lasers were claiming that they could treat pain, accelerate healing of sports injuries, and treat arthritis, but there was little evidence for this at that time.

Mester originally called this approach "laser biostimulation", but it soon became known as "low-level laser therapy". With the adaptation of light emitting diodes it became known as "low-level light therapy"; to resolve confusion around the exact meaning of "low level", the term "photobiomodulation" arose as a synonym.

== Names ==
Alternative terms for low level light therapy are: LLLT, laser biostimulation, laser phototherapy, low-level laser therapy, low-power laser irradiation, low-power laser therapy, and photobiomodulation therapy. The term photobiomodulation therapy is considered the preferred term by industry professionals. However LLLT has been marketed and researched under a number of other terms, including red light therapy, low-power laser therapy (LPLT), soft laser therapy, low-intensity laser therapy, low-energy laser therapy, cold laser therapy, bio-stimulation laser therapy, photo-biotherapy, therapeutic laser, and monochromatic infrared light energy (MIRE) therapy. More specific applications sometimes have their own terms, for example when administered to acupuncture points, the procedure is called laser acupuncture. When applied to the head, LLLT may be known as transcranial photobiomodulation, transcranial near-infrared laser therapy (NILT), or transcranial low level light therapy.

== Government action ==
The FDA filed a complaint for injunction in 2014, alleging that the company QLaser PMA was marketing its devices as being able to treat "over 200 different diseases and disorders," including cancer, cardiac arrest, deafness, diabetes, HIV/AIDS, macular degeneration, and venereal disease. This case resulted in a permanent injunction against the manufacture, marketing, sale, and distribution of those devices in 2015.

In 2017, the owner of QLaser, Robert Lytle, and two of QLaser's distributors were charged with a criminal conspiracy to commit fraud. Lytle pleaded guilty to one count of conspiracy to introduce misbranded medical devices into interstate commerce with the intent to defraud and mislead, and one count of criminal contempt in January 2018. Lytle was sentenced to serve 12 years in prison and made an initial restitution payment of $637,000. Lytle's conspirators were sentenced to 24 months and 15 months, respectively.

== Insurance coverage ==
Blue Cross Blue Shield Association and Aetna provide coverage for the prevention of oral mucositis, but not any other reason. The Centers for Medicare and Medicaid Services does not provide coverage for LLLT. Cigna lists LLLT as "experimental, investigational, or unproven for any indication" and provides literature review summaries for a number of conditions.

== Research ==
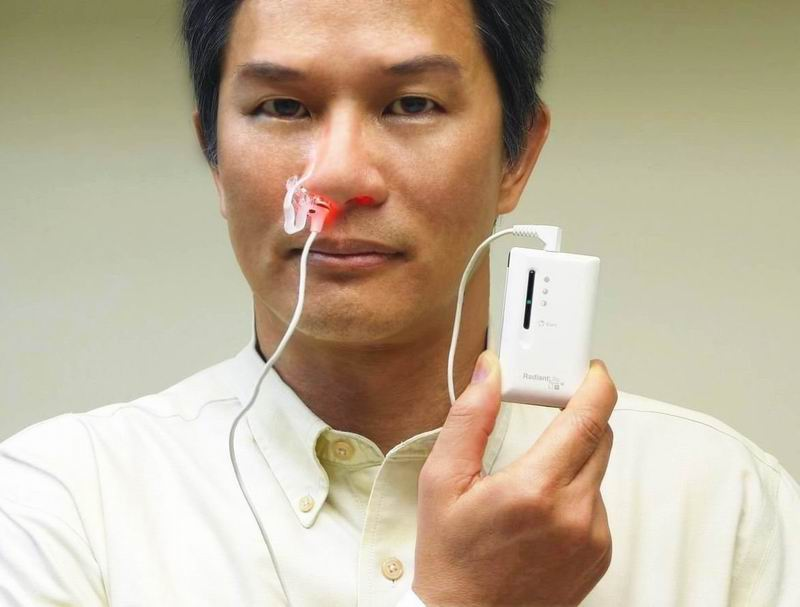
Demonstration of LLLT with intranasal irradiation

=== Musculoskeletal ===
Evidence does not support a benefit in delayed-onset muscle soreness. It may be useful for muscle pain and injuries. A 2008 Cochrane Library review concluded that LLLT has insufficient evidence for treatment of nonspecific low back pain, a finding echoed in a 2010 review of chronic low back pain. A 2015 review found benefit in nonspecific chronic low-back pain. LLLT may be useful in the treatment of both acute and chronic neck pain. In 2013, however, a systematic review and meta-analysis of LLLT for neck pain indicated that the benefit was not of significant importance and that the evidence had a high risk of bias. In a study testing the efficacy of low-level laser therapy treating plantar fasciitis found that LLLT significantly reduces pain in lower extremity tendinopathy and plantar fasciitis in the short and medium terms. The same study also stated that while comparing the effect of LLLT to that of therapeutic ultrasound in persons with patellar tendinopathy, and they found a statistically significant effect in favor of LLLT, both on pain reduction and function.

There are tentative data that LLLT is useful in the short-term treatment of pain caused by rheumatoid arthritis, and possibly chronic joint disorders. Research that compared the effects of LLLT against other treatments, sham treatments, or no treatment at all, and randomized adult patients with rheumatoid arthritis to receive it were considered. These outcomes included pain, functional capacity, adverse events, inflammation, disease activity, range of motion, stiffness in the morning, muscle strength, and quality of life. The findings indicate that the differences between utilizing a sham and an infrared laser may be negligible or nonexistent in terms of pain, stiffness in the morning, grip strength, functional ability, inflammation, range of motion, disease activity, and side events. It was also discovered that the data about the effects of laser acupuncture against reflexology in terms of functional ability, quality of life, and inflammation is quite hazy, and about the effects of red laser versus sham in terms of pain, morning stiffness, and side events. The usefulness of red laser, laser acupuncture, and reflexology in the treatment of RA patients is not well enough demonstrated. A 2019 systematic review and meta-analysis found evidence for pain reduction in osteoarthritis. While it does not appear to improve pain in temporomandibular disorders, it may improve function.

There is tentative evidence of benefit in tendinopathy. A 2014 review found benefit in shoulder tendinopathy. A 2014 Cochrane review found tentative evidence that it may help in frozen shoulder.

=== Mouth ===
Similarly, the use of lasers to treat chronic periodontitis and to speed healing of infections around dental implants is suggested, but there is insufficient evidence to indicate a use superior to traditional practices. There is tentative evidence for dentin hypersensitivity. It does not appear to be useful for orthodontic pain. LLLT might be useful for wisdom tooth extraction (complications).

=== Hair loss ===
LLLT has been studied as a treatment for hair loss; a review in 2012 found little evidence to support the use of lasers to treat hair loss. A 2014 review found tentative evidence for benefit for lasers, while another 2014 review concluded that the results were mixed, had a high risk of bias, and that its effectiveness was unclear. A 2015 review found tentative evidence of benefit. Additionally, a 2017 review of clinical trials found 10 of 11 trials reviewed "demonstrated significant improvement of androgenic alopecia in comparison to baseline or controls when treated with LLLT."

LLLT is shown to increase hair density and growth in both genders. The types of devices (hat, comb, helmet) and duration did not alter the effectiveness, with more emphasis to be placed on lasers compared to LEDs. Ultraviolet and infrared light are more effective for alopecia areata, while red light and infrared light is more effective for androgenetic alopecia.

Medical reviews suggest that LLLT is as effective or potentially more than other non invasive and traditional therapies such as minoxidil and finasteride but further studies such as RCTs, long term follow up studies, and larger double blinded trials need to be conducted to confirm the initial findings.

=== Brain injuries ===
LLLT has been studied for traumatic brain injury (TBI) and stroke among other conditions. When applied to the head it is known as transcranial photobiomodulation or transcranial low level light therapy.

=== Cancer treatment side effects ===
LLLT has been studied as a way to reduce pain and swelling in breast-cancer related lymphedema. The 2015 systematic review and meta-analysis by Smoot, Chiavola-Larson, et al found "Moderate-strength evidence supports LLLT in the management of [breast cancer related lymphoedema], with […] reductions in volume and pain immediately after conclusion of LLLT treatments. Greater reductions in volume [of lymph nodes or surrounding tissues] were found with the use of LLLT than in treatments without it."

=== Stem cells ===
An ongoing area of research is the application of LLLT for increasing cell proliferation, including stem cells.

=== Wound healing ===
Low level laser therapy has been studied as a potential treatment for chronic wounds, and higher-power lasers have sometimes been successfully used to close acute wounds as an alternative to stitching. However, as of 2012 and due to inconsistent results and the low quality of extant research, reviews in the scientific literature have not supported its widespread application.

== See also ==
- Blood irradiation therapy – Alternative medical procedure
- Light therapy – Therapy involving intentional exposure to sunlight
- Neurotechnology
- Neurotherapy
- Photomedicine – Study of light's effect on human health
- Photorejuvenation – Skin treatment
