= Differential diagnoses of depression =

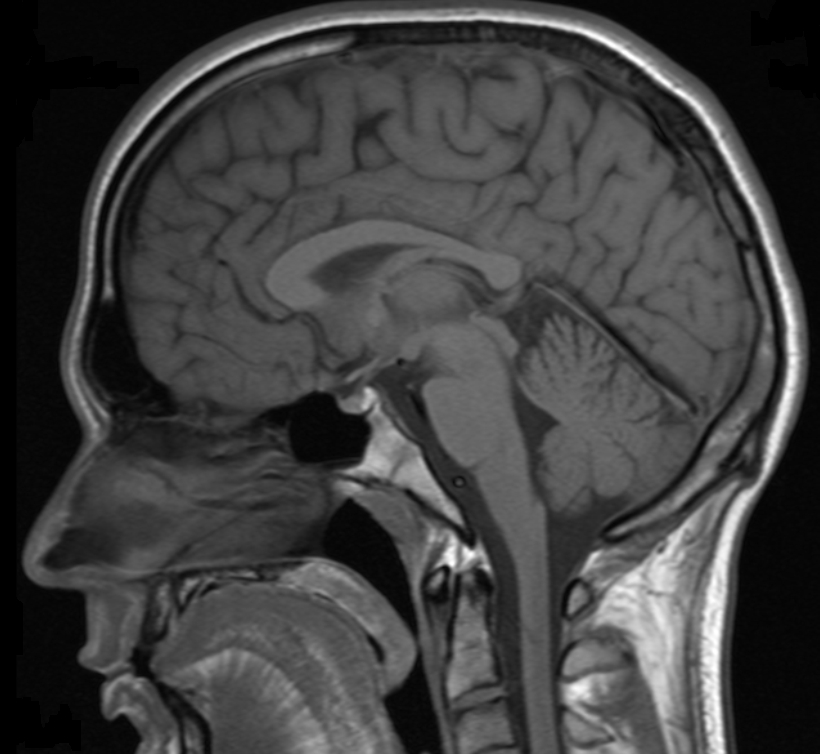
Neuroimaging can be a valuable tool in the diagnostic work-up of various psychiatric disorders including depression.

Depression, one of the most commonly diagnosed psychiatric disorders, is being diagnosed in increasing numbers in various segments of the population worldwide. Depression in the United States alone affects 17.6 million Americans each year or 1 in 6 people. Depressed patients are at increased risk of type 2 diabetes, cardiovascular disease and suicide. Within the next twenty years depression is expected to become the second leading cause of disability worldwide and the leading cause in high-income nations, including the United States. In approximately 75% of suicides, the individuals had seen a physician within the prior year before their death, 45–66% within the prior month. About a third of those who died by suicide had contact with mental health services in the prior year, a fifth within the preceding month.

There are many psychiatric and medical conditions that may mimic some or all of the symptoms of depression or may occur comorbid to it. A disorder either psychiatric or medical that shares symptoms and characteristics of another disorder, and may be the true cause of the presenting symptoms is known as a differential diagnosis. Many psychiatric disorders such as depression are diagnosed by allied health professionals with little or no medical training, and are made on the basis of presenting symptoms without proper consideration of the underlying cause, adequate screening of differential diagnoses is often not conducted. According to one study, "non-medical mental health care providers may be at increased risk of not recognizing masked medical illnesses in their patients."

Misdiagnosis or missed diagnoses may lead to lack of treatment or ineffective and potentially harmful treatment which may worsen the underlying causative disorder. A conservative estimate is that 10% of all psychological symptoms may be for medical reasons, with the results of one study suggesting that about half of individuals with a serious mental illness "have general medical conditions that are largely undiagnosed and untreated and may cause or exacerbate psychiatric symptoms".

In a case of misdiagnosed depression recounted in Newsweek, a writer received treatment for depression for years; during the last 10 years of her depression the symptoms worsened, resulting in multiple suicide attempts and psychiatric hospitalizations. When an MRI finally was performed, it showed the presence of a tumor. However, she was told by a neurologist that it was benign. After a worsening of symptoms, and upon the second opinion of another neurologist, the tumor was removed. After the surgery, she no longer had depressive symptoms.

== Autoimmune disorders ==
- Celiac disease; is an autoimmune disorder in which the body is unable to digest gluten which is found in various food grains, most notably wheat, and also rye and barley. Current research has shown its neuropsychiatric symptoms may manifest without the gastrointestinal symptoms.

"However, more recent studies have emphasized that a wider spectrum of neurologic syndromes may be the presenting extraintestinal manifestation of gluten sensitivity with or without intestinal pathology."

- Lupus: Systemic lupus erythematosus (SLE), is a chronic autoimmune connective tissue disease that can affect any part of the body. Lupus can cause or worsen depression.

== Bacterial-viral-parasitic infection ==
MRI brain scan: Neurocysticercosis

- Lyme disease; is a bacterial infection caused by Borrelia burgdorferi, a spirochete bacterium transmitted by the Deer tick (Ixodes scapularis). Lyme disease is one of a group of diseases which have earned the name the "great imitator" for their propensity to mimic the symptoms of a wide variety of medical and neuropsychiatric disorders. Lyme disease is an underdiagnosed illness, partially as a result of the complexity and unreliability of serologic testing.

"Because of the rapid rise of Lyme borreliosis nationwide and the need for antibiotic treatment to prevent severe neurologic damage, mental health professionals need to be aware of its possible psychiatric presentations.

- Syphilis; the prevalence of which is on the rise, is another of the "great imitators", which if left untreated can progress to neurosyphilis and affect the brain, can present with solely neuropsychiatric symptoms. "This case emphasises that neurosyphilis still has to be considered in the differential diagnosis within the context of psychiatric conditions and diseases. Owing to current epidemiological data and difficulties in diagnosing syphilis, routine screening tests in the psychiatric field are necessary."
- Neurocysticercosis (NCC): is an infection of the brain or spinal cord caused by the larval stage of the pork tapeworm, Taenia solium. NCC is the most common helminthic (parasitic worm) infestation of the central nervous system worldwide. Humans develop cysticercosis when they ingest eggs of the pork tapeworm via contact with contaminated fecal matter or eating infected vegetables or undercooked pork. "While cysticercosis is endemic in Latin America, it is an emerging disease with increased prevalence in the United States." "The rate of depression in those with neurocysticercosis is higher than in the general population."
- Toxoplasmosis; is an infection caused by Toxoplasma gondii an intracellular protozoan parasite. Humans can be infected in 3 different ways: ingestion of tissue cysts, ingestion of oocysts, or in utero infection with tachyzoites. One of the prime methods for transmission to humans is contact with the feces of the host species, the domesticated cat. Toxoplasma gondii infects approximately 30% of the world's human population, but causes overt clinical symptoms in only a small segment of those infected. Exposure to Toxoplasma gondii (seropositivity) without developing Toxoplasmosis has been proven to alter various characteristics of human behavior as well as being a causative factor in some cases of depression, in addition, studies have linked seropositivity with an increased rate of suicide
- West Nile virus (WNV); which can cause encephalitis has been reported to be a causal factor in developing depression in 31% of those infected in a study conducted in Houston, Texas and reported to the Center for Disease Control (CDC). The primary vectors for disease transmission to humans are various species of mosquito. WNV which is endemic to Southern Europe, Africa the Middle East and Asia was first identified in the United States in 1999. Between 1999 and 2006, 20,000 cases of confirmed symptomatic WNV were reported in the United States, with estimates of up to 1 million being infected. "WNV is now the most common cause of epidemic viral encephalitis in the United States, and it will likely remain an important cause of neurological disease for the foreseeable future."

== Blood disorders ==
- Anemia: is a decrease in normal number of red blood cells (RBCs) or less than the normal quantity of hemoglobin in the blood. Depressive symptoms are associated with anemia in a general population of older persons living in the community.

== Chronic fatigue syndrome ==
Between 1 and 4 million Americans are believed to have chronic fatigue syndrome (CFS), yet only 50% have consulted a physician for symptoms of CFS. In addition individuals with CFS symptoms often have an undiagnosed medical or psychiatric disorder such as diabetes, thyroid disease or substance abuse. CFS, at one time considered to be psychosomatic in nature, is now considered to be a valid medical condition in which early diagnosis and treatment can aid in alleviating or completely resolving symptoms. While frequently misdiagnosed as depression, differences have been noted in rate of cerebral blood flow.

CFS is underdiagnosed in more than 80% of the people who have it; at the same time, it is often misdiagnosed as depression.

== Dietary disorders ==
- Fructose malabsorption and lactose intolerance; deficient fructose transport by the duodenum, or by the deficiency of the enzyme, lactase in the mucosal lining, respectively. As a result of this malabsorption the saccharides reach the colon and are digested by bacteria which convert them to short chain fatty acids, CO_{2}, and H_{2}. Approximately 50% of those affected exhibit the physical signs of irritable bowel syndrome.

"Fructose malabsorption may play a role in the development of depressed mood. Fructose malabsorption should be considered in patients with symptoms of major depression...."

"Fructose and sorbitol reduced diet in subjects with fructose malabsorption does not only reduce gastrointestinal symptoms but also improves mood and early signs of depression."

== Endocrine system disorders ==
Dysregulation of the endocrine system may present with various neuropsychiatric symptoms; irregularities in the hypothalamic-pituitary- adrenal (HPA) axis and the hypothalamic-pituitary-thyroid (HPT) axis have been shown in patients with primary depression.

HPT and HPA axes abnormalities observed in patients with depression
(Musselman DL, Nemeroff CB. 1996)

HPT axes irregularities:

- alterations in thyroid-stimulating hormone (TSH) response to thyrotropin-releasing hormone (TRH)
- an abnormally high rate of antithyroid antibodies
- elevated cerebrospinal fluid (CSF) TRH concentrations.

HPA axes irregularities:

- adrenocorticoid hypersecretion
- enlarged pituitary and adrenal gland size (organomegaly)
- elevated corticotropin-releasing factor (CRF) concentrations

=== Adrenal gland ===
- Addison's disease: also known as chronic adrenal insufficiency, hypocortisolism, and hypocorticism) is a rare endocrine disorder wherein the adrenal glands, located above the kidneys, produce insufficient steroid hormones (glucocorticoids and often mineralocorticoids). "Addison's disease presenting with psychiatric features in the early stage has the tendency to be overlooked and misdiagnosed."
- Cushing's Syndrome, also known as hypercortisolism, is an endocrine disorder characterized by an excess of cortisol. In the absence of prescribed steroid medications, it is caused by a tumor on the pituitary or adrenal glands, or more rarely, an ectopic hormone-secreting tumor. Depression is a common feature in diagnosed patients and it often improves with treatment.

=== Thyroid and parathyroid glands ===
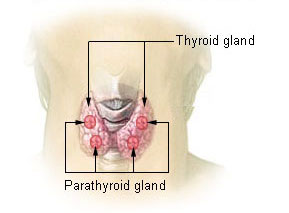

- Graves' disease: an autoimmune disease where the thyroid is overactive, resulting in hyperthyroidism and thyrotoxicosis.
- Hashimoto's thyroiditis: also known chronic lymphocytic thyroiditis is an autoimmune disease in which the thyroid gland is gradually destroyed by a variety of cell and antibody mediated immune processes. Hashimoto's thyroiditis is associated with thyroid peroxidase and thyroglobulin autoantibodies
- Hashitoxicosis
- Hypothyroidism
- Hyperthyroidism
- Hypoparathyroidism; can affect calcium homeostasis, supplementation of which has completely resolved cases of depression in which hypoparathyroidism is the sole causative factor.

=== Pituitary tumors ===
Tumors of the pituitary gland are fairly common in the general population with estimates ranging as high as 25%. Most tumors are considered to be benign and are often an incidental finding discovered during autopsy or as of neuroimaging in which case they are dubbed "incidentalomas". Even in benign cases, pituitary tumors can affect cognitive, behavioral and emotional changes. Pituitary microadenomas are smaller than 10 mm in diameter and are generally considered benign, yet the presence of a microadenoma has been positively identified as a risk factor for suicide.

"... patients with pituitary disease were diagnosed and treated for depression and showed little response to the treatment for depression".

=== Pancreas ===
- Hypoglycemia: an overproduction of insulin causes reduced blood levels of glucose. In one study of patients recovering from acute lung injury in intensive care, those patients who developed hypoglycemia while hospitalized showed an increased rate of depression.

== Neurological ==
=== CNS Tumors ===
In addition to pituitary tumors, tumors in various locations in the central nervous system may cause depressive symptoms and be misdiagnosed as depression.

=== Post concussion syndrome ===
Post-concussion syndrome (PCS), is a set of symptoms that a person may experience for weeks, months, or occasionally years after a concussion with a prevalence rate of 38–80% in mild traumatic brain injuries, it may also occur in moderate and severe cases of traumatic brain injury. A diagnosis may be made when symptoms resulting from concussion, depending on criteria, last for more than three to six months after the injury, in which case it is termed persistent postconcussive syndrome (PPCS). In a study of the prevalence of post concussion syndrome symptoms in patients with depression utilizing the British Columbia Postconcussion Symptom Inventory: "Approximately 9 out of 10 patients with depression met liberal self-report criteria for a postconcussion syndrome and more than 5 out of 10 met conservative criteria for the diagnosis." These self reported rates were significantly higher than those obtained in a scheduled clinical interview. Normal controls have exhibited symptoms of PCS as well as those seeking psychological services. There is considerable debate over the diagnosis of PCS in part because of the medico-legal and thus monetary ramifications of receiving the diagnosis.

=== Pseudobulbar affect ===
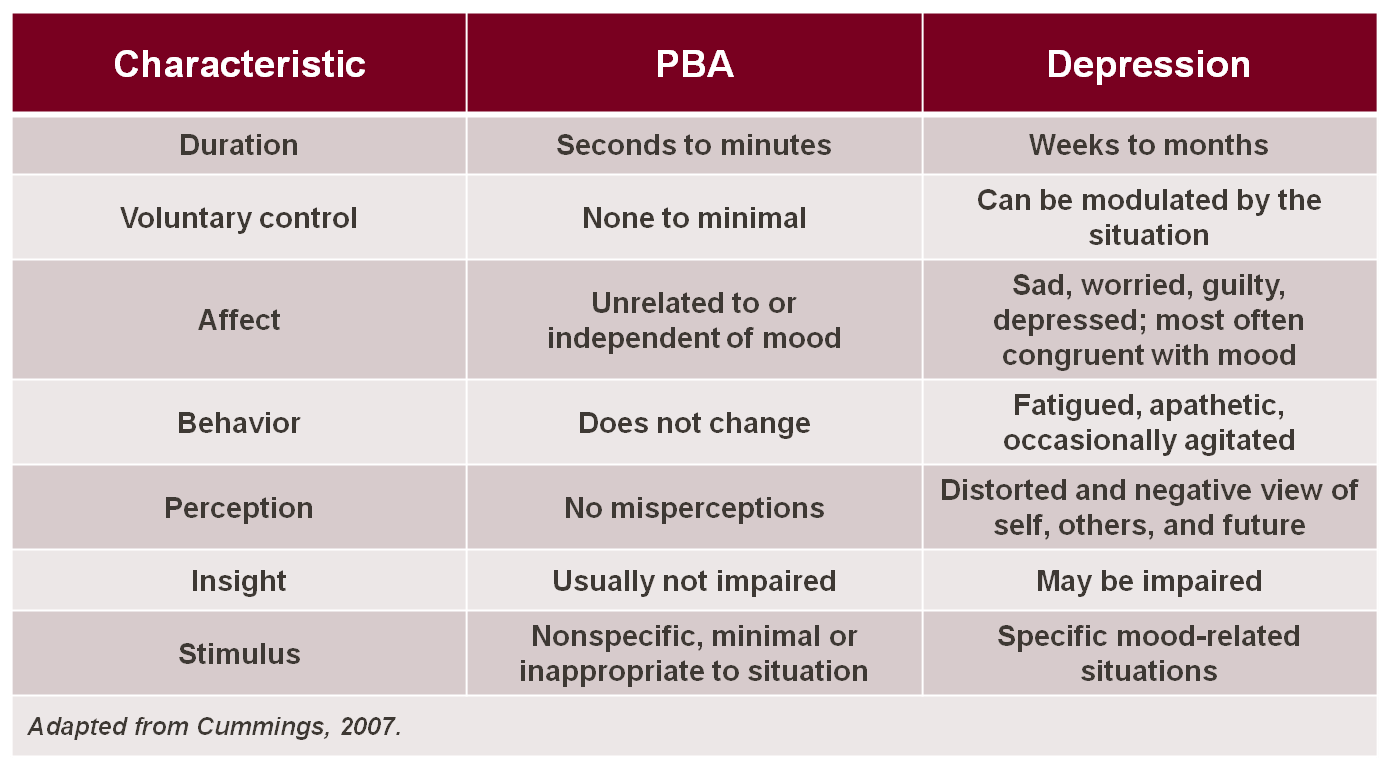
Diagnostic differences between PBA and depression

Pseudobulbar affect (PBA) is an affective disinhibition syndrome that is largely unrecognized in clinical settings and thus often untreated due to ignorance of the clinical manifestations of the disorder; it may be misdiagnosed as depression. It often occurs secondary to various neurodegenerative diseases such as amyotrophic lateral sclerosis, and also can result from head trauma. PBA is characterized by involuntary and inappropriate outbursts of laughter and/or crying. PBA has a high prevalence rate with estimates of 1.5–2 million cases in the United States alone.

=== Multiple sclerosis ===
Multiple sclerosis is a chronic demyelinating disease in which the myelin sheaths of cells in the brain and spinal cord are irreparably damaged. Symptoms of depression are very common in patients at all stages of the disease and may be exacerbated by medical treatments, notably interferon beta-1a.

== Neurotoxicity ==
Various compounds have been shown to have neurotoxic effects many of which have been implicated as having a causal relationship in the development of depression.

=== Cigarette smoking ===
There has been research which suggests a correlation between cigarette smoking and depression. The results of one recent study suggest that smoking cigarettes may have a direct causal effect on the development of depression. There have been various studies done showing a positive link between smoking, suicidal ideation and suicide attempts.

In a study conducted among nurses, those smoking between 1-24 cigarettes per day had twice the suicide risk; 25 cigarettes or more, 4 times the suicide risk, than those who had never smoked. In a study of 300,000 male U.S. Army soldiers, a definitive link between suicide and smoking was observed with those smoking over a pack a day having twice the suicide rate of non-smokers.

Link Between Smoking Depression and Suicide

"Current daily smoking, but not past smoking, predicted the subsequent occurrence of suicidal thoughts or attempt."

"It would seem unwise, nevertheless, to rule out the possibility that smoking might be among the antecedent factors associated with the development of depression."

"Abstinence from cigarettes for prolonged periods may be associated with a decrease in depressive symptomatology."

"The stress induction model of smoking suggests, however, that smoking causes stress and concomitant negative affect."

=== Medication ===
Various medications have been suspected of having a causal relation in the development of depression; this has been classified as "organic mood syndrome". Some classes of medication such as those used to treat hypertension, have been recognized for decades as having a definitive relationship with the development of depression.

Monitoring of those taking medications which have shown a relationship with depression is often indicated, as well as the necessity of factoring in the use of such medications in the diagnostic process.

- Topical Tretinoin (Retin-A); derived from Vitamin A and used for various medical conditions such as in topical solutions used to treat acne vulgaris. Although applied externally to the skin, it may enter the bloodstream and cross the blood brain barrier where it may have neurotoxic effects.
- Interferons; proteins produced by the human body, three types have been identified alpha, beta and gamma. Synthetic versions are utilized in various medications used to treat different medical conditions such as the use of interferon-alpha in cancer treatment and hepatitis C treatment. All three classes of interferons may cause depression and suicidal ideation.

=== Chronic exposure to organophosphates ===
The neuropsychiatric effects of chronic organophosphate exposure include mood disorders, suicidal thinking and behaviour, cognitive impairment and chronic fatigue.

== Neuropsychiatric ==
=== Bipolar disorder ===
- Bipolar disorder is frequently misdiagnosed as major depression, and is thus treated with antidepressants alone which is not only not efficacious it is often contraindicated as it may exacerbate hypomania, mania, or cycling between moods. There is ongoing debate about whether this should be classified as a separate disorder because individuals diagnosed with major depression often experience some hypomanic symptoms, indicating a continuum between the two.

== Nutritional deficiencies ==
Nutrition plays a key role in every facet of maintaining proper physical and psychological wellbeing. Insufficient or inadequate nutrition can have a profound effect on mental health. The emerging field of nutritional neuroscience explores the various connections between diet, neurological functioning and mental health.

- Vitamin B_{6}: pyridoxal phosphate (PLP), the active form of B_{6}, is a cofactor in the dopamine serotonin pathway, a deficiency in vitamin B_{6} may cause depressive symptoms.
- Folate (vitamin B_{9}) – Vitamin B_{12} cobalamin: Low blood plasma and particularly red cell folate and diminished levels of vitamin B_{12} have been found in patients with depressive disorders. "[W]e suggest that oral doses of both folic acid (800 μg/(mcg) daily) and vitamin B12 (1 mg daily) should be tried to improve treatment outcome in depression."
- Long chain fatty acids: higher levels of omega-6 and lower levels of omega-3 fatty acids has been associated with depression and behavioral change.
- Vitamin D deficiency is associated with depression

== Sleep disorders ==
- Insomnia: While the inability to fall asleep is often a symptom of depression, it can also in some instances serve as the trigger for developing a depressive disorder. It can be transient, acute or chronic. It can be a primary disorder or a co-morbid one.
- Restless legs syndrome (RLS), also known as Wittmaack-Ekbom's syndrome, is characterized by an irresistible urge to move one's body to stop uncomfortable or odd sensations. It most commonly affects the legs, but can also affect the arms or torso, and even phantom limbs. Restless Leg syndrome has been associated with Major depressive disorder. "Adjusted odds ratio for diagnosis of major depressive disorder... suggested a strong association between restless legs syndrome and major depressive disorder and/or panic disorder."
- Sleep apnea is a sleep disorder characterized by pauses in breathing during sleep. Each episode, called an apnea, lasts long enough for one or more breaths to be missed; such episodes occur repeatedly throughout the sleep cycle. Undiagnosed sleep apnea may cause or contribute to the severity of depression.
- Circadian rhythm sleep disorders, of which few clinicians are aware, often go untreated or are treated inappropriately, as when misdiagnosed as either primary insomnia or as a psychiatric condition.

== See also ==
- Rosenhan experiment
- Seasonal Pattern Assessment Questionnaire

== Bibliography ==
- A Dose of Sanity: Mind, Medicine, and Misdiagnosis by Sydney Walker. John Wiley & Sons, 1997. ISBN 0-471-19262-7
