= Springtime lethargy =

State of fatigue or depression at the onset of spring

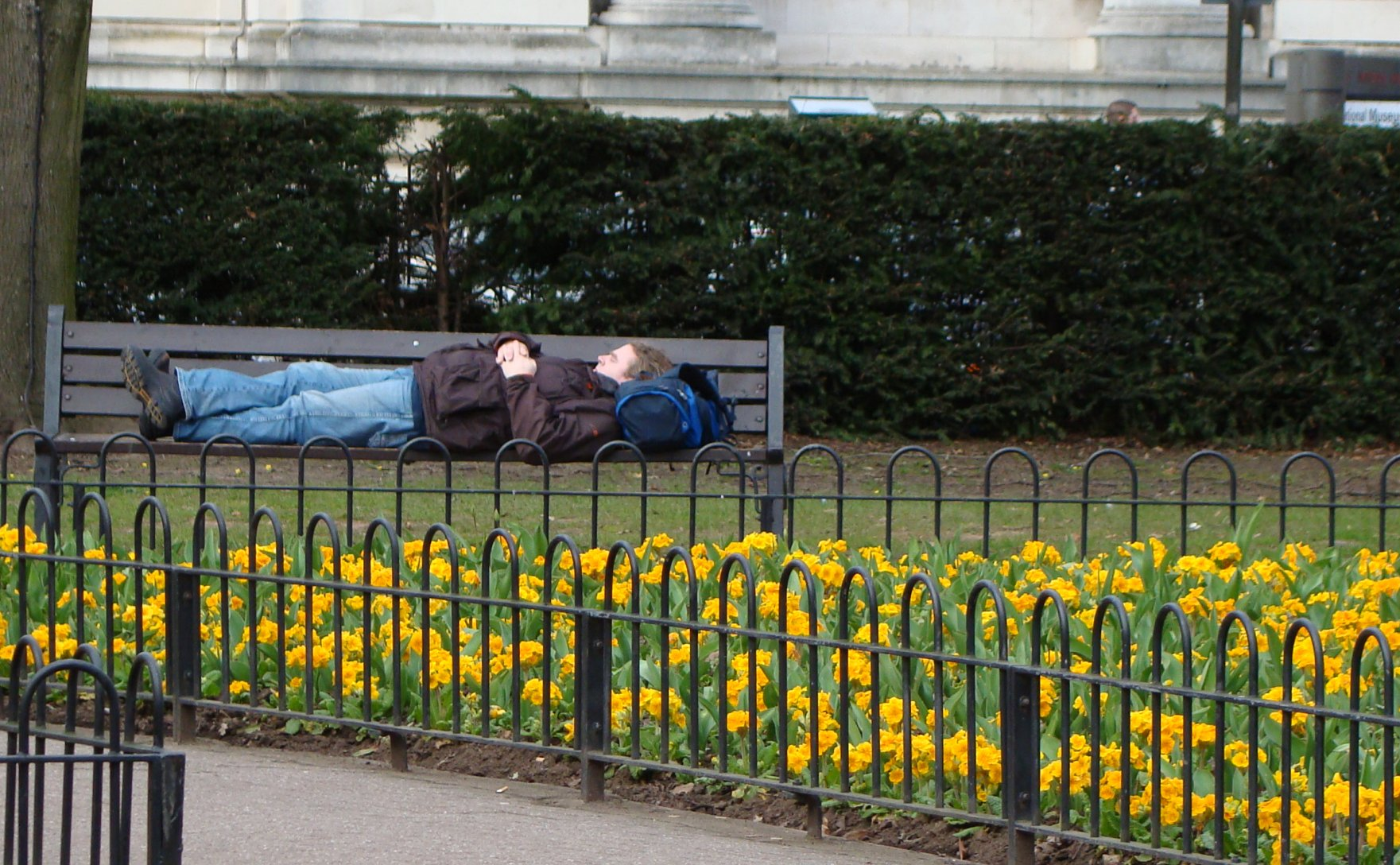
A man taking a nap in the spring

Springtime lethargy is the state of fatigue, lowered energy, or depression associated with the onset of spring. Such a state may be caused by a normal reaction to warmer temperatures, or it may have a medical basis, such as allergies or reverse seasonal affective disorder. In many regions, there is a springtime peak in suicide rates.

Psychological and socio-cultural factors also play a role. The opening lines of Eliot's classic poem express some of the complex emotional associations that may be familiar to those who experience dark moods in the spring:

April is the cruellest month, breeding
Lilacs out of the dead land, mixing
Memory and desire, stirring
Dull roots with spring rain.

— T. S. Eliot, The Waste Land

Occasionally, such lethargy or depression may be described as "spring fever", though this term also relates to an increase in energy and restlessness or to romantic and sexual feelings in the spring.

The German term Frühjahrsmüdigkeit (lit. "Spring fatigue") is the name for a temporary mood or physical condition, typically characterized by a state of low energy and weariness, experienced by many people in springtime. It is not in the category of a diagnosed illness but rather a phenomenon thought to be initiated by a change in the season. Reportedly, an estimated 50–75% of people in Germany have experienced its effect.

== Symptoms ==
In the northern hemisphere, the symptoms usually arise from mid-March to mid-April, and depending on the person, they may be more or less pronounced. Weariness (despite an adequate amount of sleep), sensitivity to changes in the weather, dizziness, irritability, headaches, and sometimes aching joints and a lack of drive are the most common.

== Causes ==
Although the causes of this springtime lethargy have not yet been fully resolved, hormone balance may play a role. According to this hypothesis, the body's reserves of the "happiness hormone" serotonin, whose production depends on daylight, become exhausted over the winter, making it especially easy for the "sleep hormone" melatonin to have its effect. When the days become longer in springtime, the body readjusts its hormone levels, and more endorphin, testosterone, and estrogen are released. This changeover puts a heavy strain on the body, which responds with a feeling of tiredness.

In addition, temperatures usually fluctuate greatly in springtime. When temperatures rise, a person's blood pressure drops, since the blood vessels expand. The expansion of blood vessels is called vasodilation. Food also plays a role. In winter, one tends to consume more calories, fat, and carbohydrates than in summer. But during the hormone adjustment period, the body requires more vitamins and proteins instead.
