= Norman E. Rosenthal =

Psychiatrist, researcher, and author

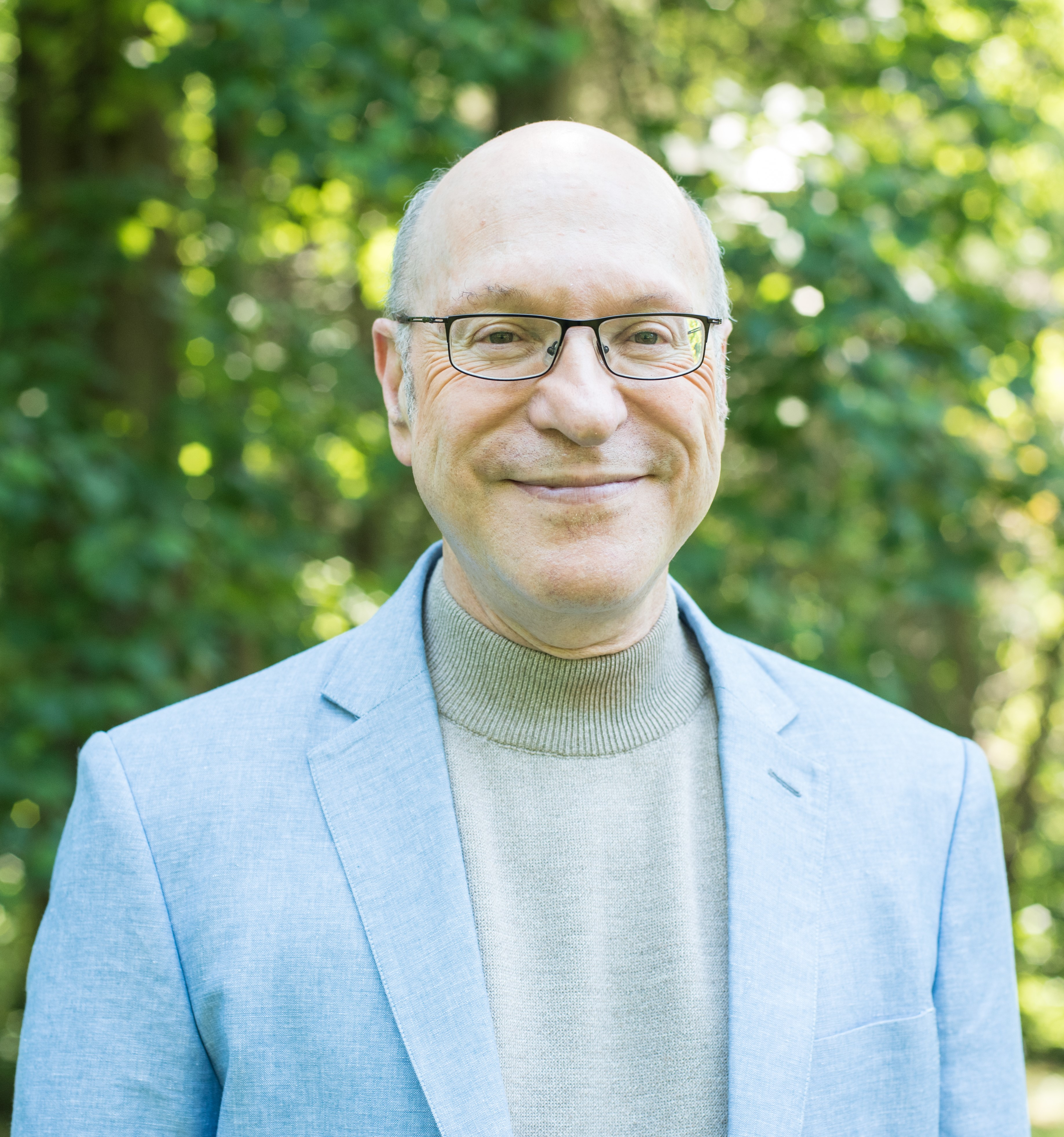
- Norman E. Rosenthal
- Born: Johannesburg, South Africa
- Occupations: Researcher, professor, psychiatrist, author
- Website: http://normanrosenthal.com/

Norman E. Rosenthal is an American author, psychiatrist and scientist who first described seasonal affective disorder (SAD), and developed light therapy as a treatment.

Rosenthal was born and educated in South Africa but moved to the United States to complete his medical training. He established a private practice and conducted research at the National Institute of Mental Health (NIMH) as a researcher and senior researcher for more than twenty years. It was here that he studied disorders of mood, sleep, and biological rhythms and was the first psychiatrist to describe and diagnose seasonal affective disorder (SAD).

Rosenthal's research with SAD led him to write Defeating SAD, Winter Blues and two other books on the topic. Rosenthal has written two books on the Transcendental Meditation technique (Transcendence and Super Mind). He researched its potential application on patients with posttraumatic stress disorder (PTSD). He has also written a memoir (The Gift of Adversity) and a book on therapeutic effects of poetry (Poetry RX). In total, he has written eleven books and published over 300 scholarly papers.

== Early life and education ==
Rosenthal was born and raised in Johannesburg, South Africa. He attended King David High School in the former Transvaal Province. He graduated in 1963 with "top marks" among the English-speaking students.

He received his M.B. B.Ch. (equivalent of an M.D.) from the University of the Witwatersrand in Johannesburg and graduated cum laude. He completed an internship in Internal Medicine and Surgery at Johannesburg General Hospital.

He moved to the United States to further his education as a resident, and then he became Chief Resident in psychiatry at the New York State Psychiatric Institute and Columbia Presbyterian Hospital.

== Career ==
Rosenthal began a private practice in the suburbs of Washington, D.C., in 1979. At the same time, he began a research fellowship with Frederick Goodwin at the National Institute of Mental Health in Bethesda, Maryland. This was the beginning of a 20-year career with the NIMH as a Researcher, Research Fellow, and Senior Researcher. Rosenthal became the director of seasonal studies at the institute and in 1985, led research with 662 participants on the effects of seasonal affective disorder (SAD) and later studied the psycho-physiological phenomena of spring fever.

Rosenthal co-authored the book, How to Beat Jet Lag with Walter Reich and Thomas A. Wehr. The book explains a technique to stabilize circadian rhythms that lead to jet lag. Since 2000, Rosenthal has been a clinical professor of psychiatry at Georgetown Medical School. He became medical director and CEO of a clinical trial organization Capital Clinical Research Associates in Rockville, Maryland in 2001 until 2012. He received a special recognition award from the Society for Light Treatment & Biological Rhythms (SLBTR) in 1999 and published the book The Emotional Revolution: How the New Science of Feeling Can Transform Your Life in 2002.

Early in his career, Rosenthal learned the Transcendental Meditation technique while in South Africa, but found that as a medical student and a medical resident he didn't have time to practice. Then 35 years later, after one of his patients had a dramatic improvement as a result of TM, he began practicing again and then began recommending it to his patients. In 2011, he published Transcendence: Healing and Transformation Through Transcendental Meditation, which was listed on the New York Times' Best Sellers: Hardcover Advice, How-To And Miscellaneous list. Earlier that year, Rosenthal published preliminary research on the potential influence of TM on posttraumatic stress disorder. Later he collaborated with Sanford Nidich on a comparison of TM versus prolonged exposure in veterans with PTSD at the San Diego VA.

Collaborating with Eric Finzi, Rosenthal found that botulinum toxin (botox) injected into the muscles of the forehead produced antidepressant effects in people with depression.

Rosenthal has written more than 300 scholarly publications and his writings have been featured in the American Journal of Psychiatry, Psychiatry Research, Archives of General Psychiatry, Biological Psychiatry, Molecular Psychiatry, and Journal of Affective Disorders. He continues to treat patients with SAD and to coach executives and other professionals. He is often cited in mainstream media as an expert on the topic of SAD.

=== Awards and honors ===
Rosenthal has received the A.P.A. New York District Branch prize for paper written by a resident, the Psychiatric Institute Alumni Prize for best research performed by Psychiatric Institute Resident, the Public Health Service Commendation Medal, the Anna Monika Foundation Award for Depression Research, the Public Health Service Outstanding Service Award and the David Lynch Foundation lifetime achievement award for public health.

=== Seasonal affective disorder ===
Rosenthal is referred to as the pioneer of research into seasonal affective disorder. In 1984, he coined the term and began studying the use of light therapy as a treatment. Rosenthal's interest in studying the effects of the seasons on mood changes emerged when he emigrated from the mild climate of Johannesburg, South Africa, to the northeastern US. As a resident in the psychiatry program at the New York State Psychiatric Institute, he noticed that he was more energetic and productive during the long days of summer versus the shorter darker days of the winter.

In 1980, his team at NIMH admitted a patient with depression who had observed seasonal changes within himself and thought previous research regarding melatonin release at night may be able to help him. Rosenthal and his colleagues treated the patient with bright lights, which helped to successfully manage the depression. They conducted a formal follow-up study to confirm the success. The results were published in 1984, officially describing SAD and pioneering light therapy as an effective treatment method. Although not all researchers agree with Rosenthal's conclusions on the effect of light therapy, the latest version of the Textbook of Mood Disorders published by the American Psychiatric Association includes a chapter on SAD and light therapy for mood disorders and light therapy for SAD. Light therapy for SAD is also endorsed by the National Institute for Mental Health, the Mayo Clinic, and the Cleveland Clinic.

Rosenthal has written four books on the topic of SAD: Seasons of the Mind: Why You Get the Winter Blues and What You Can Do About It (1989), Winter Blues: Everything You Need to Know to Beat Seasonal Affective Disorder (1993) and Winter Blues Survival Guide: A Workbook For Overcoming SAD (2014), and Defeating SAD: A Guide to Health and Happiness Through All Seasons. He has also co-edited the book Seasonal Affective Disorders and Phototherapy (1989). In 1984, he developed the Seasonal Pattern Assessment Questionnaire, a widely used screening tool for seasonality. As a result of his research and publications, "it is now widely acknowledged that winter depression has a sound medical basis, involving changes in the body's mood centers" associated with exposure to light. With his colleague Thomas Wehr, Rosenthal later identified a form of reverse SAD which some experience in the summer season.

== Books ==
- Rosenthal, Norman; Blehar M, Mary (1989). Seasonal Affective Disorders and Phototherapy. New York: Guilford Press. p. 350. ISBN 0898627419.
- Rosenthal, Norman (1993). Seasons of the Mind: Why You Get the Winter Blues and What You Can Do About It. Bantam Books. ISBN 0553053957.
- Rosenthal, Norman; co-authored with D.A.Oren, W. Reich and T.A. Wehr (1993). How to Beat Jet Lag. New York: Henry Holt & Company Inc. p. 141. ISBN 0805026878.
- Rosenthal, Norman (1993). Winter Blues. New York: Guilford Press. p. 372. ISBN 1593851162.
- Rosenthal, Norman (1998). St. John's Wort: The Herbal Way to Feeling Good. New York: Harper Collins. ISBN 0060183829.
- Rosenthal, Norman (2002). The Emotional Revolution: How the New Science of Feeling Can Transform Your Life. New York: Citadel. ISBN 080652295X.
- Rosenthal, Norman (2011). Transcendence: Healing and Transformation Through Transcendental Meditation. New York: Hay House UK Ltd. p. 320. ISBN 978-1848507753.
- Rosenthal, Norman (2013). The Gift of Adversity: The Unexpected Benefits of Life's Difficulties, Setbacks, and Imperfections. New York: Tarcher. ISBN 978-0399168857.
- Rosenthal ND, Benton CM (2014). Winter Blues Survival Guide: A Workbook for Overcoming SAD. The Guilford Press. p. 273. ISBN 9781462512324.
- Rosenthal, Norman (2016). Super Mind: How to Boost Performance and Live a Richer and Happier Life Through Transcendental Meditation. New York: Tarcher Penguin. p. 324. ISBN 978-158542-873-1.
- Rosenthal, Norman (2021). Poetry RX: How 50 Inspiring Poems Can Heal and Bring Joy to Your Life. G&D Media. p. 364. ISBN 9781722505462.
- Rosenthal, Norman (2023). Defeating SAD (Seasonal Affective Disorder): A Guide to Health and Happiness Through All Seasons. G&D Media. p. 230. ISBN 9781722506308.
