= Transcendental Meditation technique =

Form of silent mantra meditation

The Transcendental Meditation (TM) technique is that associated with Transcendental Meditation, developed by the Indian spiritual figure Maharishi Mahesh Yogi. It uses a private mantra and is practised for 20 minutes twice per day while sitting comfortably with closed eyes. TM instruction encourages students to be not distracted by random thoughts which arise and to easily return to the mantra once aware of them.

Advocates of TM claim that the technique promotes a state of relaxed awareness, stress-relief, creativity, and efficiency, as well as physiological benefits such as reducing the risk of heart disease and high blood pressure. The technique is purported to allow practitioners to experience higher states of consciousness. Advanced courses supplement the TM technique with the TM-Sidhi program.

The methodological quality of scientific research on the therapeutic benefits of meditation in general is poor, because of the varying theoretical approaches and frequent confirmation bias in individual studies. A 2012 meta-analysis published in Psychological Bulletin, which reviewed 163 individual studies, found that Transcendental Meditation performed no better overall than other meditation techniques in improving psychological variables. A 2014 Cochrane review of four trials found that it was impossible to draw any conclusions about whether TM is effective in preventing cardiovascular disease, as the scientific literature on TM was limited and at "serious risk of bias". A 2015 systematic review and meta-analysis of 12 studies found that TM may effectively reduce blood pressure compared to control groups.

== Practice ==
The technique is recommended for 20 minutes twice per day. According to the Maharishi, "bubbles of thought are produced in a stream one after the other", and the Transcendental Meditation technique consists of experiencing a "proper thought" in its more subtle states "until its subtlest state is experienced and transcended". Because it is mantra-based, the technique "ostensibly meets the working definition of a concentration practice". The TM organisation explains that "focused attention" is not prescribed, and "the aim is a unified and open attentional stance". Other authors describe the technique as an easy, natural technique or process, and a "wakeful hypometabolic physiologic state". Practice of the technique includes a process called "unstressing" which combines "effortless relaxation with spontaneous imagery and emotion". TM teachers caution their students not to be alarmed by random thoughts and to "attend" to the mantra. Scottish chess grandmaster Jonathan Rowson has said that his TM practice gives "a feeling of serenity, energy and balance", but does not provide "any powerful insight into your own mind". Laura Tenant, a reporter for The Independent, said that her TM experience includes going "to a place which was neither wakefulness, sleeping or dreaming", and becoming "detached from my physical self". Worldwide, four to six million people over the decade 2003 to 2013 have been reported to be practitioners.

=== Mantra ===
The TM technique consists of silently repeating a mantra with "gentle effortlessness" while sitting comfortably with eyes closed and without assuming any special yoga position. The mantra is said to be a vehicle that allows the individual's attention to travel naturally to a less active, quieter style of mental functioning. TM meditators are instructed to keep their mantra secret to ensure maximum results, to avoid confusion in the mind of the meditators, and as a "protection against inaccurate teaching".

==== Selection ====
The Maharishi is reported to have standardised and "mechanized" the mantra selection process by using a specific set of mantras and making the selection process "foolproof". Professor of psychiatry Norman E. Rosenthal writes that during the training given by a certified TM teacher, "each student is assigned a specific mantra or sound, with instructions on its proper use". The Maharishi said that the selection of a proper thought or mantra "becomes increasingly important when we consider that the power of thought increases when the thought is appreciated in its infant stages of development". He said that mantras chosen for initiates should "resonate to the pulse of his thought and as it resonates, create an increasingly soothing influence", and that the chosen mantra's vibrations "harmonize" with the meditator and suit his/her "nature and way of life". Author George D. Chryssides writes that according to the Maharishi, "using just any mantra can be dangerous"; the mantras for "householders" and for recluses differ. According to Chryssides, many mantras – such as "Om" – commonly found in books are mantras for recluses and "can cause a person to withdraw from life".

Former TM teacher and author Lola Williamson reports that she told her TM students that their mantra was chosen for them based on their personal interview, while sociologist Roy Wallis and religious scholar J. Gordon Melton write that the mantras are assigned by age and gender. In 1984, 16 mantras were published in Omni magazine based on information from "disaffected TM teachers". According to Chryssides, TM teachers say that the promised results are dependent on a trained Transcendental Meditation teacher choosing the mantra for their student.

==== Meaning and sound value ====
In his 1963 book The Science of Being and Art of Living, the Maharishi writes that words create waves of vibrations, and the quality of vibration of a mantra should correspond to the vibrational quality of the individual. Likewise, religious studies scholar Thomas Forsthoefel writes, "the theory of mantras is the theory of sound". Author William Jefferson writes that the "euphonics" of mantras are important. Sociologist Stephen J. Hunt and others say that the mantra used in the Transcendental Meditation technique "has no meaning", but that "the sound itself" is sacred. In Kerala, India, in 1955, the Maharishi spoke of mantras in terms of personal deities, and according to religious studies scholar Cynthia Ann Humes, similar references can be found in his later works.

According to authors Peter Russell and Norman Rosenthal, the sounds used in the technique are taken from the ancient Vedic tradition, have "no specific meaning", and are selected for their suitability for the individual. Nevertheless, the Maharishi mentions that sometimes it is beneficial for the Mantra to be associated with a specific meaning in order to suit one's own private psychological background. Author Lola Williamson writes that the bija, or seed mantras, used in TM come from the Tantric, rather than Vedic tradition, and that bija mantras are "traditionally associated with particular deities and used as a form of worship". According to Needleman, many mantras come from the Vedas or Vedic hymns, which are "the root for all later Hindu scripture", while the 1977 court case Malnak vs. Yogi accepted the TM mantras as meaningless sounds. Likewise, philosophy of science scholar and former Maharishi International University professor Jonathan Shear writes in his book The Experience of Meditation: Experts Introduce the Major Traditions that the mantras used in the TM technique are independent of meaning associated with any language, and are used for their mental sound value alone. Fred Travis of the Maharishi University of Management writes in a 2009 article published in the International Journal of Psychophysiology that "unlike most mantra meditations, any possible meaning of the mantra is not part of Transcendental Meditation practice".

== Courses ==
The Transcendental Meditation technique is taught in a standardised seven-step course over six days by a certified TM teacher. Except for a requirement to refrain from using non-prescription drugs for 15 days before learning TM, all who want to learn are taught provided they can pay the course fee which as of 2023, ranges from $420 for students to $980 for members of households with incomes of $200,000 or more. The technique is taught via private and group instruction by a TM teacher trained to instruct students and provide follow up. Instruction is given on separate days, beginning with a one-hour "introductory lecture" intended to prepare the student for subsequent steps. The lecture discusses mind potential, social relationships, health, and "promoting inner and outer peace". The second step is a 45-minute "preparatory lecture", whose topic is the theory of the practice, its origins and its relationship to other types of meditation. This is followed by the third step: a private, ten-minute, personal interview, allowing the TM teacher to get acquainted with the student and answer questions.

According to the TM web site, the personal instruction session takes 1–2 hours, and students are required to bring a clean handkerchief, some flowers and fruit, and their course fee. The initiation begins with a short puja ceremony performed by the teacher. The stated purpose of the ceremony is to show honour and gratitude to the lineage of TM "masters", or "Holy Tradition" that is listed in the Maharishi's translation and commentary of the Bhagavad-Gita. It is regarded as putting students in the right frame of mind to receive the mantra. The ceremony is conducted in a private room with a "little" white altar containing incense, camphor, rice, flowers and a picture of Maharishi's teacher, Guru Dev. The initiate observes passively as the teacher recites a text in Sanskrit. After the ceremony, the "meditators" are "invited to bow", receive their mantra and begin to meditate.

On the day after the personal instruction session, the student begins a series of three 90-to-120-minute "teaching sessions", held on three consecutive days, called "three days of checking". Their stated purpose is to "verify the correctness of the practice" and to receive further instruction. The first day's checking meeting takes place in a group on the day following personal instruction, and gives information about correct practice based on each student's own experience. The second day of checking uses the same group format, and gives more details of the mechanics of the practice and potential results of the practice, based on student experiences. The third day of checking focuses on subjective growth and the potential development of higher stages of human consciousness, and outlines the follow-up programs available as part of the course. New meditators later return for private follow-up sessions to confirm that they are practising the technique properly, a process called "personal checking". The preferred schedule for follow-up classes is 30 minutes, once per week for one month, and once per month thereafter. The purpose of the follow-up, or "checking sessions", is to verify the practice, give an opportunity for one-on-one contact with a TM teacher, and to address any problems or questions. Course graduates may access a lifetime follow-up program which includes consultations, "refresher courses", advanced lectures and group meditations. Advanced courses include weekend Residence Courses and the TM-Sidhi program.

According to the TM organisation, TM course fees cover "initial training and the lifetime follow-up" program, while helping to "build and maintain TM centers" and schools in India and around the world. The fees also reportedly provide TM scholarships for special-needs groups, as well as grants and scholarships through TM's Maharishi Foundation, a government-approved 501(c)(3) non-profit, educational organisation. The fees may "vary from country to country", depending on the cost of living, and have changed periodically during the 50-year period that the course has been taught.

The Maharishi has drawn criticism from yogis and "stricter Hindus" who have accused him of selling "commercial mantras". At the same time, the Maharishi's "promises of better health, stress relief and spiritual enlightenment" have drawn "devotees from all over the world", despite the fees. According to The Complete Idiot's Guide to World Religions, by Brandon Toropov and Father Luke Buckles, insistence on fees for TM instruction has caused criticism of the Maharishi's motives.

=== TM-Sidhi program ===
The TM-Sidhi program is a form of meditation introduced by Maharishi Mahesh Yogi in 1975. It is based on, and described as a natural extension of the Transcendental Meditation technique. The goal of the TM-Sidhi program is to accelerate personal growth and improve mind–body coordination by training the mind to think from what the Maharishi has described as a fourth major state of consciousness. called Transcendental Consciousness.

Yogic flying, a mental-physical exercise of hopping while cross-legged, is a central aspect of the TM-Sidhi program. With the introduction of the TM-Sidhi program in 1976, it was postulated that a group of people practising the TM-Sidhi program twice a day, together in one place, would increase "life-supporting trends" in the surroundings, with the threshold for the group size being the square root of 1% of the area's population. This was called the "Extended Maharishi Effect", referring to the "Maharishi effect" with a threshold of 1% of the population. These effects have been examined in 14 published studies, including a gathering of over 4,000 people in Washington DC in the summer of 1993. While empirical studies have been published in peer-reviewed academic journals this research remains controversial and has been characterised as pseudoscience by sceptics James Randi, Carl Sagan, and others. The editor of the Journal of Conflict Resolution that published some of the research also questioned its validity. Bob Roth, a high-profile TM teacher and CEO of the David Lynch Foundation, has acknowledged that nobody has ever observed a practitioner hover or fly via yogic flying.

== Teachers ==
The Maharishi began training TM teachers in the early 1960s, and by 1978, there were 7,000 TM teachers in the United States. In 1985, there were an estimated 10,000 TM teachers worldwide, and by 2003, there were 20,000 teachers, and a reported 40,000 teachers in 2008. Notable individuals trained to teach the Transcendental Meditation technique include Prudence Farrow, John Gray, Mitch Kapor, and Mike Love.

The first teacher training course was held in India with 30 participants in 1967 and 200 participants in 1970. A four-month teacher training course was also held in the United States that year. The first part was four weeks long and was offered in both Poland, Maine and Humboldt, California with the final three months being held in Estes Park, Colorado. About 300 people completed the training. In 1973, the TM teacher training course consisted of three months in-residence. A 2007 TM web page and 2009 book, report that the TM teacher training course in more modern times consists of six months in-residence, and includes courses in Maharishi Vedic Science, extended meditation practice and becoming the "custodian" for an "ancient Vedic tradition". Additionally, TM teachers are trained to speak on the Transcendental Meditation program, teach it to others, provide "personal checking" of their students' meditation, create lectures on related topics, organise and lead advanced TM courses and programs. The Maharishi trained his teachers to "make logical presentations in language suitable to their audiences", and teachers lead their students through a sequence of predetermined steps.

A 2007 research study reported that details of the training and knowledge imparted to teachers are kept private. In 1976, Janis Johnson wrote in The Christian Century that TM teachers sign a "loyalty-oath employment contract", saying "It is my fortune, Guru Dev, that I have been accepted to serve the Holy Tradition and spread the Light of God to all those who need it." Author William Bainbridge writes that a section of a training bulletin for TM teachers called "Explanations of the Invocation" draws a "connection to Brahma, the Lord of Creation". A 1993 article in the Ottawa Citizen reported a partial translation of the puja as "Whosoever remembers the lotus-eyed Lord gains inner and outer purity. To Lord Naryan, to Lotus-born Brahman the creator, to Vaishistha, to Shakti, to Shankaracharya the emancipator, hailed as Krishna, to the Lord I bow down and down again. At whose door the whole galaxy of gods pray for perfection day and night".

== Research ==
Scientists have been conducting research on meditation, including TM, since the late 1960s and hundreds of studies have been published. Transcendental Meditation has become one of the most widely researched meditation techniques. TM research has played a role in the history of mind–body medicine and encouraged neuroscience research focusing on the effects of meditation.

Early studies examined the physiological parameters of meditation. Subsequent research included clinical applications, cognitive effects, mental health, medical costs, and rehabilitation. Beginning in the 1990s, research focused on cardiovascular disease. Research reviews of the effects of the Transcendental Meditation technique have yielded results ranging from inconclusive to clinically significant. More research is needed to determine the therapeutic effects of meditation practices and sources vary regarding their assessment of the quality of research. Some cite design limitations and a lack of methodological rigour, while others assert that the quality is improving and that when suitable assessment criteria are applied, scientific evidence supports the therapeutic value of meditation. Reviewers Canter and Ernst assert that some studies have the potential for bias due to the connection of researchers to the TM organisation while TM researchers point to their collaboration with independent researchers and universities as signs of objectivity.

== Institutional programs ==
=== Schools and universities ===
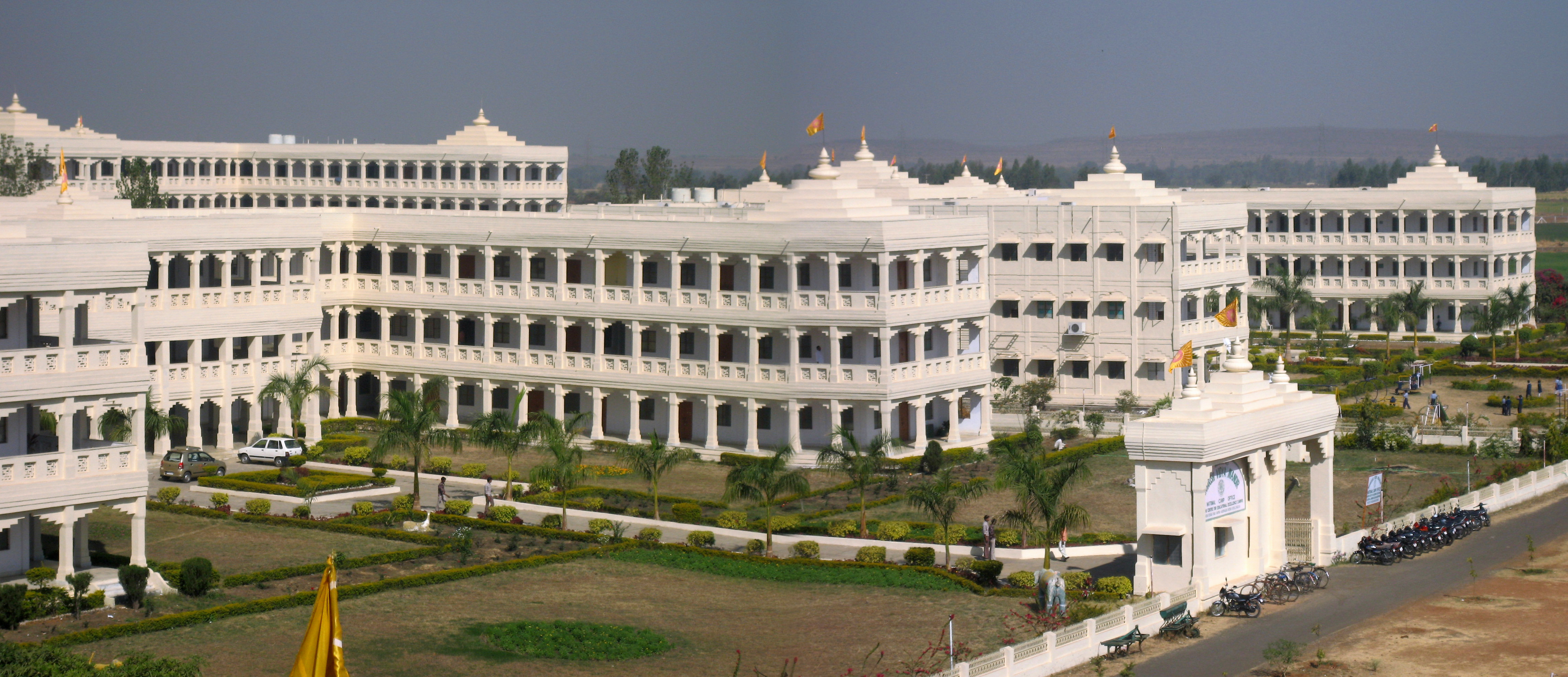
Maharishi Centre for Educational Excellence, Bhopal, India

Transcendental Meditation in education (also known as Consciousness-Based Education) is the application of the Transcendental Meditation technique in an educational setting or institution. These educational programs and institutions have been founded in the United States, United Kingdom, Australia, India, Africa and Japan. The Transcendental Meditation technique became popular with students in the 1960s and by the early 1970s centers for the Students International Meditation Society were established at a thousand campuses in the United States with similar growth occurring in Germany, Canada and Britain. The Maharishi International University was established in 1973 in the United States and began offering accredited degree programs. In 1977 courses in Transcendental Meditation and the Science of Creative Intelligence (SCI) were banned from New Jersey public high schools on religious grounds by virtue of the Establishment Clause of the First Amendment. This "dismantled" the TM program's use of government funding in US public schools but "did not constitute a negative evaluation of the program itself". Since 1979, schools that incorporate the Transcendental Meditation technique using private, non-governmental funding have been reported in the United States, South America, Southeast Asia, Northern Ireland, South Africa and Israel.

A number of educational institutions have been founded by Maharishi Mahesh Yogi, the Transcendental Meditation movement and its supporters. These institutions include several schools offering public and private secondary education in the United States (Maharishi School of the Age of Enlightenment), England (Maharishi School), Australia (Maharishi School), South Africa (Maharishi Invincibility School of Management), and India (Maharishi Vidya Mandir Schools). Likewise, Maharishi colleges and universities have been established including Maharishi European Research University (Netherlands), Maharishi Institute of Management (India), Maharishi University of Management and Technology (India), Maharishi Institute (South Africa) and Maharishi Mahesh Yogi Vedic University (India). According to an article in Newsweek, "critics believe that TM is a repackaged form of Eastern religious philosophy" and opposed its use in public schools while a member of the Pacific Justice Institute says practising Transcendental Meditation in public schools with private funding is constitutional.

=== Corporate programs ===
Transcendental Meditation has been utilised in corporations, both in the United States and in India, under the auspices of the International Foundation for the Science of Creative Intelligence and the Maharishi Development Corporation. As of 2001, US companies such as General Motors and IBM were subsidising the TM course fee for their employees. A number of Indian companies provide the TM technique to their managers. These companies include AirTel, Siemens, American Express, SRF Limited, Wipro, Hero Honda, Ranbaxy, Hewlett Packard, BHEL, BPL Group, ESPN Star Sports, Tisco, Eveready, Maruti, Godrej Group and Marico. The Sunday Times Herald reports that there are more than 100 Japanese companies where TM was introduced at induction.

=== Social programs ===
The TM technique has been incorporated in US social programs for criminals, the homeless and war veterans. In 1979, it was offered to inmates at Folsom prison, San Quentin and the Deuel Vocational Institute. According to a TM representative, meditation has been included at "over 25 prisons and correctional institutions" in the United States.

In Senegal, more than 11,000 prisoners and 900 correctional officers in 34 prisons received instruction in TM between 1985 and 1987, and the wardens at 31 prisons signed a proclamation recommending that TM be offered throughout the entire system. More recently, the TM technique has been introduced to prisoners in the Oregon Correctional System and a research study is underway to record the effects of the program. Since the late 1980s the TM technique has been offered as part of the programs at Fundacion Hogares Claret sanctuary for homeless and orphaned children in Medellín, Colombia.

In 1996, several judges of the 22nd Judicial Circuit of St Louis, Missouri, began ordering convicted felons to attend a TM course as one of their conditions for parole. The program was administered by the non-profit Enlightened Sentencing Project and received endorsements from federal judge Henry Autrey and other members of the Missouri district, federal, and supreme courts.

In 2010, the Doe Fund of New York City began offering the TM technique to its residents, and homeless men were given instruction in the TM technique through an organisation called Ready, Willing and Able. In 2010, the Superintendent of Prisons announced that the TM technique was being offered to inmates at the Dominica State Prison. In 2011, the technique was taught to about 65 individuals at the Children of the Night shelter for teen prostitutes in Los Angeles. Psychiatry professor Norman E. Rosenthal says that TM is compatible with "most drug treatment approaches" and could be incorporated into an overall treatment program.

=== Military ===
TM was first employed by the military in 1985, when the US Armed Forces conducted "a small pilot study" on Vietnam veterans. The Transcendental Meditation technique was taught to military personnel with post traumatic stress syndrome (PTSD) as part of two research studies conducted at the University of Colorado and Georgetown University in 2010. In 2012, the Department of Veterans Affairs announced that it was "studying the use of transcendental meditation to help returning veterans of the Iraq and Afghanistan wars" and the Department of Defense funded a $2.4 million grant to Maharishi University of Management Research Institute and the San Diego Veterans Administration Medical Center to further investigate the potential effect of the TM technique on PTSD. Other initiatives to teach the TM technique to war veterans at risk for PTSD, were underway as of 2010. The technique has been taught to students at Norwich University, a private military academy, as "part of a long-term study" on meditation and military performance.

== Characterizations and criticism ==
Characterizations of the TM technique vary amongst scholars, clergy, practitioners and governments. According to the Maharishi his technique requires no preparation, is simple to do, and can be learned by anyone. The technique is described as effortless and without contemplation or concentration Author Peter Russell says trying to control the mind is like trying to go to sleep at night, it won't work. He says instead, the TM technique utilises the tendency of the mind to move toward greater satisfaction. According to TM advocates, the technique is "purely a mechanical, physiological process", the "two-minute ceremony" invokes no deities, the mantras are "sounds without meaning" and the technique "pre-dates Hinduism by 5,000 years". Anthony Campbell, author of the book Seven States of Consciousness, writes that TM requires no "special circumstances or preparations" and does "not depend upon belief". A 2011 article in Details characterises the TM technique as a "Hindu meditation practice ["stripped"] of its religious baggage" offered "as a systematic, stress-reducing, creativity-building technique". Martin Gardner, a mathematician, has referred to TM as "the Hindu cult". According to author R.S. Bajpai, the Maharishi "secularized the TM [sic] by purging it of all the religious rites and rituals and spiritual mysticism".

=== By religious leaders ===
Some religious leaders and clergy find TM to be compatible with their religious teachings and beliefs, while others do not. Wayne Teasdale, a Catholic monk, said that TM "is what is called an open or receptive method" that can be described as giving up control and remaining open in an inner sense. In 1968, the Archbishop of Canterbury, Michael Ramsey, "came to the support of Maharishi's theory". William Jefferson wrote in 1976 that a Jewish Revivalist had called TM "an insidious form of worship" while Trappist monks in Spencer, Massachusetts, had found it useful. In 1984, Cardinal Jaime Sin, the Archbishop of Manila, wrote a pastoral statement after Ferdinand Marcos, then president of the Philippines, invited more than 1,000 members of the TM movement to Manila, saying that neither the doctrine nor the practice of TM is acceptable to Christians. In 2003, the Roman Curia published a warning against mixing eastern meditations, such as TM, with Christian prayer, though a 2013 statement suggests that eastern meditations can be useful. Clergy who practice the TM technique and find it compatible with their religious beliefs include: Catholic priest Len Dubi; Orthodox rabbi Abe Shainberg; Irish Jesuit William Johnston; Donald Craig Drummond, a Presbyterian minister; Raphael Levine, the emeritus rabbi of Temple De Hirsh Sinai; Placide Gaboury, a Jesuit priest who teaches at the University of Sudbury; Kevin Joyce, a Catholic priest; and Keith Wollard, a United Church minister.

=== By laypeople ===
Lay celebrities who have practised the technique include David Lynch, who was raised a Presbyterian, and Clint Eastwood who says he found "there were no religious aspects", comedian Andy Kaufman, political commentator and Roman Catholic Andrew Sullivan, Jerry Seinfeld, who has been practising the technique for 40 years, and Pulitzer Prize winning music critic Tim Page. Once asked if TM could substitute for religion, musician George Harrison replied that "It's not a substitute for religion. It is a religion." According to John Lennon, "You can make it with meditation if you're a Christian, a Mohammedan or a Jew. You just add meditation to whatever religion you've got."

=== By scholars ===
The technique has been variously described by sociologists and religious scholars as religious and non-religious. Its adherents says it is a non-religious, "scientific strategy", yet it appears to have "spiritual elements" such as the puja ceremony performed during the TM instruction. Religious studies scholar Eugene V. Gallagher writes that, "practitioners describe TM as a science rather than a religious discipline", but its "principles were clearly derived from Hindu practice".

In the book Cults and New Religious Movements, author Roy Wallis characterises TM as a "world affirming new religion" that "lacks most of the features traditionally associated with religion". Liebler and Moss write that "unlike some forms of meditation, the TM technique does not require adherence to any belief system". Religious studies scholars Michael Phelan, James R. Lewis and Tamar Gablinger say that TM participants "may meditate for relaxation, but otherwise have no contact with TM", and that TM "attracts a large number of people with low levels of commitment around a much smaller group of highly committed followers." Phelan writes that TM is "being opposed by many religious groups who believe that it is a religious practice", and that "the TM objectives and methods are congruous with the criteria of revitalization movements [as] defined by Anthony F.C. Wallace ... whose goal is to create a better culture." Charles H. Lippy writes that earlier spiritual interest in the technique faded in the 1970s, and "it became a practical technique ... that anyone could employ without abandoning their religious identification."

On the other hand, Bainbridge finds TM to be a "... highly simplified form of Hinduism, adapted for Westerners who did not possess the cultural background to accept the full panoply of Hindu beliefs, symbols, and practices", and describes the TM puja ceremony as "... in essence, a religious initiation ceremony". Metropolitan Maximos of Pittsburgh of the Greek Orthodox Church describes TM as "a new version of Hindu Yoga" based on "pagan pseudo-worship and deification of a common mortal, Guru Dev".

In the book Cults and new religions, Cowan and Bromley write that TM is presented to the public as a meditation practice that has been validated by science, but is not a religious practice nor is it affiliated with a religious tradition. They say that "although there are some dedicated followers of TM who devote most or all of their time to furthering the practice of Transcendental Meditation in late modern society, the vast majority of those who practice do so on their own, often as part of what has been loosely described as the New Age Movement." They say that most scholars view TM as having elements of both therapy and religion, but that it "has no designated scripture, no set of doctrinal requirements, no ongoing worship activity, and no discernible community of believers." They also say that Maharishi did not claim to have special divine revelation or supernatural personal qualities.

George D. Chryssides and Margaret Z. Wilkins write in A reader in new religious movements that TM and other new religious movements have been criticised for "surreptitiously smuggling in forms of Eastern religion under the guise of some seemingly innocuous technique of self improvement or health promotion". Chryssides went on to say in Exploring new religions that although one can identify the yogi's Hindu background, Hindu lineage, mantras and initiation ceremony, TM is unlike religion in its "key elements": "there is no public worship, no code of ethics, no scriptures to be studied, and no rites of passage that are observed, such as dietary laws, giving to the poor, or pilgrimages." Psychiatry professor Norman E. Rosenthal, author of Transcendence: Healing and Transformation Through Transcendental Meditation, wrote that "Maharishi extracted the TM technique from its religious context and distilled it to its essence, which he believed could be of value to people of all creeds."

=== By government ===
In 1968, the Maharishi conducted a one-hour meeting with Secretary General of the United Nations U Thant. In the 1970s, courses in the TM technique were conducted at 47 military installations around the world (including eight in the U.S.), with 150 enrolling in the course at the West Point military academy. The TM technique was also taught at five U.S. federal prisons, and three in Germany and Canada. During this period, ten U.S. senators and more than 100 Congressional staff members learned the technique. In 1972, the Maharishi met with the Governor of Illinois (Daniel Walker) and received a standing ovation when he addressed the Illinois state legislature before they passed a resolution characterising Maharishi's Science of Creative Intelligence as useful for Illinois public schools. In 1974, TM was cited in two Congressional records regarding the SCI course being offered at 30 American universities and the technique being "in use" in some American prisons, mental institutions and drug rehabilitation centers.

In 1975, the Maharishi met with Pierre Trudeau to discuss "the possibility of structuring an ideal society" through TM. In 1977 a U.S. district court in New Jersey held that a curriculum comprising the Science of Creative Intelligence and TM was religious in nature (Malnak v Yogi). The decision was appealed and in 1979 the 3rd Circuit opinion affirmed the decision and held that although SCI/TM is not a theistic religion, it deals with issues of ultimate concern, truth, and other ideas analogous to those of well-recognized religions and it therefore violated the Establishment Clause. Beginning in 1979 the German government released a number of booklets about problems arising for seven new religious movements in Germany, with the German term for these organisations variously translated as "psychogroups" and "psychotheraphy groups". These organisations, including TM, filed lawsuits trying to block the reports. The courts ruled that the booklets must only include factual information and exclude speculation, rumours, and matters that are unclear, and the booklets were re-released primarily containing quotations from materials of the organisations themselves. In 1996 a commission appointed by the German government concluded that new religious movements and "psychotherapy groups" did not present any danger to the state or to society. In 1987, an Israeli government report defined TM as a "cult group ... targeted by anti-cult activists". The 1995 report of the Parliamentary Commission on Cults in France included Transcendental Meditation in its list of cults. The U.S. government has characterised the Transcendental Meditation technique as worthy of research and has awarded more than $25 million in funding from different branches of the National Institutes of Health for scientific analysis of the effects of TM on high blood pressure. The United States Department of Veterans Affairs sees it as a potential tool for the treatment of post traumatic stress disorder (PTSD) in veterans of the Iraq and Afghanistan wars, and commenced research on the technique (and two other meditation systems) in 2012. According to Patrick Gresham Williams, "the government will pay" for any U.S. veteran to learn TM if it is prescribed by a Veterans Administration medical doctor.
