= Transcendence (Rosenthal book) =

2011 book by Norman E. Rosenthal

Transcendence: healing and transformation through transcendental meditation
- First edition
- Author: Norman E. Rosenthal
- Language: English
- Publisher: Tarcher
- Publication date: June 2, 2011
- Publication place: United States
- Pages: 320
- ISBN: 978-1-58542-873-1

Transcendence: Healing and Transformation Through Transcendental Meditation is a book written by psychiatrist and researcher Norman E. Rosenthal, published in 2011 by the Tarcher imprint of the Penguin Group. It presents the author's personal experiences and professional views on Transcendental Meditation research, as well as interviews with celebrity practitioners. The book contains a foreword by Mehmet Oz and four main sections entitled: "Transcendence", "Healing", "Transformation", and "Harmony."

An updated paperback edition was released in 2012 that contained a new final chapter titled "After Transcendence."

== Overview ==
The book presents the author's personal experiences with Transcendental Meditation, his analysis and commentary on the Transcendental Meditation research, and interviews with celebrity practitioners such as Paul McCartney, Ringo Starr, David Lynch, Martin Scorsese, Laura Dern, Russell Brand and Moby. The author discusses studies in the areas of stress, anxiety and depression, addiction, attention-deficit disorder (ADHD) and post-traumatic stress disorder (PTSD). He also recounts the experiences of inner-city schoolchildren, war veterans, and formerly homeless and incarcerated men.

According to the publisher the book describes how Transcendental Meditation is learned and "what they [the readers] stand to gain, physically and emotionally, from achieving transcendence". According to the author it is "not a manual on how to do" the Transcendental Meditation technique.

== Content ==
The book contains a foreword by Mehmet Oz, a question and answer interview with Bob Roth, executive director of the David Lynch Foundation, in the Appendix and the body of the book is divided into four parts.

Part I, Transcendence, has three chapters; Introduction: My Journey Back, A Return to the Self: Aspects of Meditation, and The Mind Within the Mind: What is Transcendence? This section, describes the author's personal history with the Transcendental Meditation technique; how he first heard about it, when and why he learned and the people he has met who are practicing the technique.

Part II, Healing, has a single chapter called, Decompression: Managing Toxic Stress. This section discusses the concept of "transcendence" and its potential relationship to toxic stress, particularly in regard to heart disease and hypertension.

Part III, Transformation, has seven chapters:

- Turning Off the Brains Alarm System: Treating Anxiety and Anger
- The Schoolboy Who Pulled Out His Hair: Attention, Priorities, and Effectiveness
- Helping the Spikes and Valleys: Meditation and Moods
- Silencing the Bubble Machine: Addiction and Recovery
- An Island of Safety in a Sea of Trouble: Transformation in Schools
- Learning to Love Yourself: The Long Road Back from Prison
- Self-Actualization—Your Personal Best

Part IV is called, Harmony and has one chapter called, Harmony: Coherence at Many Levels. In this section the author discusses the concept of coherence and postulates parallels between coherence in the brain and harmony in society.

== Reception ==
The book appeared at number seven on the NY Times list of Best Sellers: Hardcover Advice, How-To And Miscellaneous, number eight on the Washington Post Non Fiction list, and number 14 on the ABC News, Best seller, Hardcover Non-Fiction list during its first week of publication.

A reviewer at PsychCentral, wrote: "I opened the book and began to read stories that inspired me and gave me hope that one day I might be a meditator too" and the chapters on "acute anxiety, major depression, and bipolar disorder" were "especially enlightening".

Articles in CNN and The Sunday Times reported on the book's case studies relating to posttraumatic stress disorder. The Independent reported that the book "urges healthcare professionals to offer it [TM] to patients suffering from mental illnesses"
