= Dawn simulation =

Light timing technique to simulate dawn

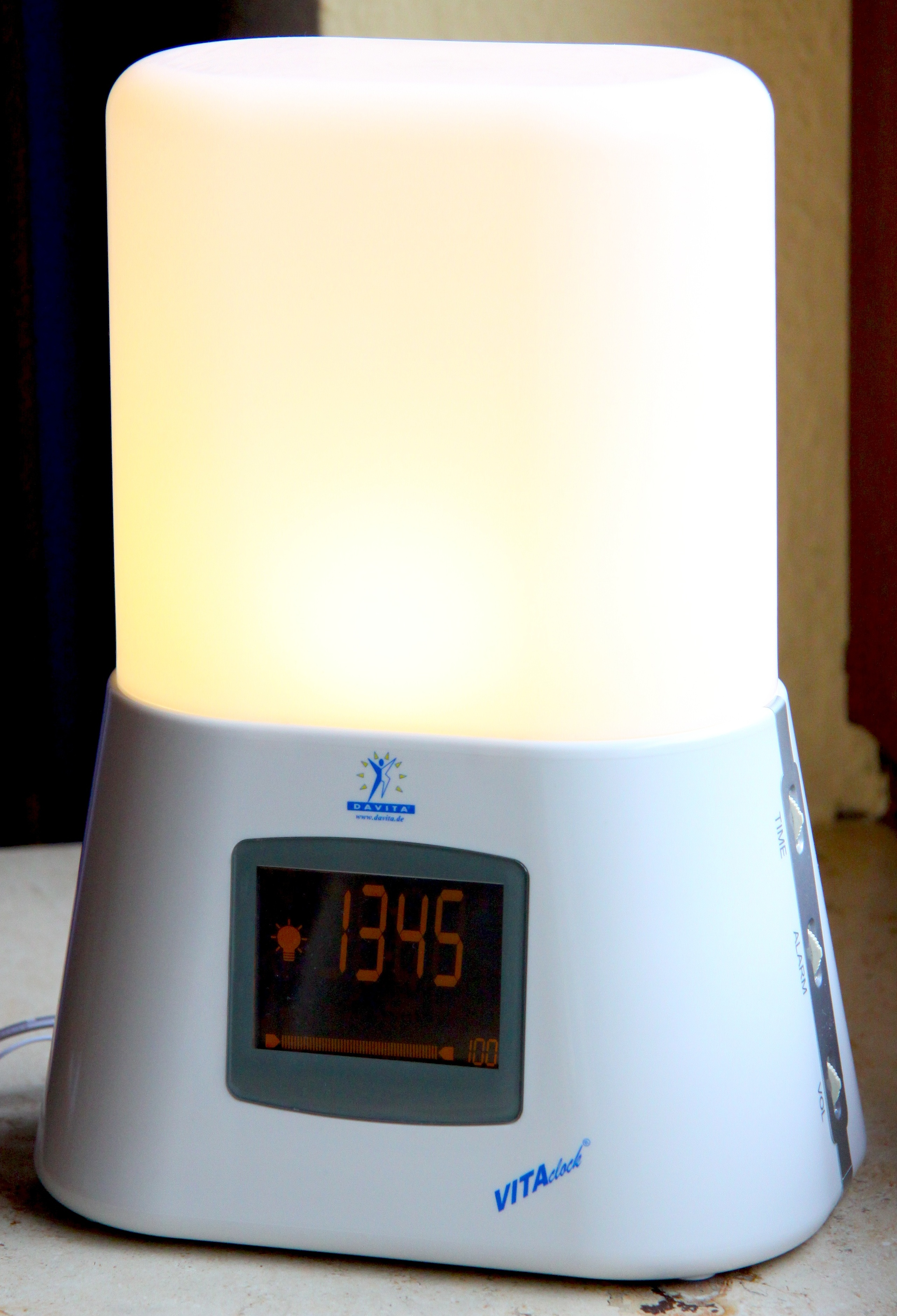
A dawn simulation alarm clock

Dawn simulation is a technique that involves timing a light, often called a wake-up light, sunrise alarm clock, or natural light alarm clock, in the bedroom to come on gradually, over a period of 30 minutes to 2 hours, before awakening to simulate dawn.

== History ==
The concept of dawn simulation was first patented in 1890 as "mechanical sunrise". Modern electronic units were patented in 1973. Clinical trials were conducted by David Avery, MD, in the 1980s at Columbia University following a long line of basic laboratory research that showed animals' circadian rhythms to be sensitive to the dim, gradually rising dawn signal at the end of the night. An example of a commercial dawn Simulator was patented by Outside In Cambridge UK (now known as Lumie) in 2005.GB 2422448A

== Clinical use ==
There are two types of dawn that have been used effectively in a clinical setting: a naturalistic dawn mimicking a springtime sunrise (but used in mid-winter when it is still dark outside), and a sigmoidal-shaped dawn (30 minutes to 2 hours). When used successfully, patients are able to sleep through the dawn and wake up easily at the simulated sunrise, after which the day's treatment is over. The theory behind dawn simulation is based on the fact that early morning light signals are much more effective at advancing the biological clock than are light signals given at other times of day (see Phase response curve).

=== Comparison with bright light therapy ===
Dawn simulation generally uses light sources that range in illuminance from 100 to 300 lux, while bright light boxes are usually in the 10,000-lux range. Approximately 19% of patients discontinue post-awakening bright light therapy due to inconvenience. Because the entire treatment is complete before awakening, dawn simulation may be a more convenient alternative to post-awakening bright light therapy. In terms of efficacy, some studies have shown dawn simulation to be more effective than standard bright light therapy while others have shown no difference or shown that bright light therapy is superior.Some patients with seasonal affective disorder use both dawn simulation and bright light therapy to provide maximum effect at the start of the day.

=== Other uses ===
In an elaboration of the method, patients have also been presented with a dim dusk signal at bedtime, with indications that it eases sleep onset. In addition, the technique has been used clinically with patients who suffer from delayed sleep phase syndrome, helping them to awaken earlier in gradual steps, as the simulated dawn is moved earlier.

== Non-clinical sleep and wake-up uses ==
A dawn simulator can be used as an alarm clock. Light enters through the eyelids triggering the body to begin its wake-up cycle, including the release of cortisol, so that by the time the light is at full brightness, sleepers wake up on their own, without the need for an alarm. Most commercial alarm clocks include a "dusk" mode as well for bedtime.

== See also ==
- Chronotherapy (treatment scheduling) – Use of circadian or other rhythmic cycles of a condition's symptoms in applying therapy
