= Spring fever =

Experience of restlessness or romantic feelings

Spring fever is any of a number of mood, physical, or behavioral changes which may be experienced coinciding with the onset of spring, particularly restlessness, laziness, and amorousness.

== Overview ==
The term spring fever may refer to an increase in energy, vitality, and sexual appetite, as well as a feeling of restlessness, associated with the end of winter. This concept may have a biological basis. A lift in mood with the arrival of spring, and longer periods of daylight, is often particularly strong in those suffering from seasonal affective disorder (SAD), who experience lows or depression during the winter months. Symptoms of bipolar disorder are also more likely in spring.

In the 17th and 18th centuries in Australia, Spring fever or Spring disease described an often fatal condition associated with skin lesions, bleeding gums and lethargy. The disease was later identified as scurvy with a simple cure of dietary fresh vegetables and fruit.
