= Seasonal Pattern Assessment Questionnaire =

Screening test for seasonal affective disorder

- Purpose: screening instrument for seasonal affective disorder

The Seasonal Pattern Assessment Questionnaire, or SPAQ, is a simple, self-administered screening test for Seasonal Affective Disorder, first developed in 1984. Though some aspects of its accuracy have been questioned since then, it is widely used today, especially by SAD researchers.

== Description ==
The SPAQ is a screening instrument for seasonal affective disorder (SAD), a recurrent major depressive disorder that typically affects its victims during the fall and winter months. It was first developed by American psychiatrist Norman E. Rosenthal and his National Institute of Mental Health colleagues in 1984, and continues to be widely used. It is a self-administered paper-and-pencil test that is freely available in the public domain. The SPAQ can be downloaded.

The questionnaire asks subjects to score the amounts of seasonal changes they have experienced in sleep, socialization, mood, weight, appetite and energy. A global score between 0 and 24 is gotten by adding up the scores on each of these items. Subjects also specify the months during which these changes are greatest and least. Subjects are also asked rate their overall seasonal impairment from "no problem" to "disabling".

Subjects are often taught how to interpret their scores, and cautioned that a self-assessment can never substitute for a clinical evaluation. If their score on the SPAQ is high, they are advised to consult their physician.

== Reliability, validity, and specificity ==
Numerous studies have been done to assess the usefulness of the test. In general, it has been found to be reliable (in that it yields consistent measurements) and valid (in that it measures what it purports to measure). It has also been found to have low specificity (in that people who have other forms of depression can score as if they have SAD). This could give misleadingly high estimates of the prevalence of SAD.

Some studies have questioned the overall validity of the SPAQ, and even the concept of SAD itself.

In spite of its shortcomings, the SPAQ is still a very popular screening tool in SAD research. This is true because of its early development, historically wide dissemination, and the absence of better-validated alternatives.
