= British Columbia Postconcussion Symptom Inventory =

- Purpose: measure of the ICD-10 criteria for Post concussion syndrome

The British Columbia Postconcussion Symptom Inventory (BC-PSI), is a 16 item self-report inventory designed to measure both the frequency, and intensity of the ICD-10 criteria for Post concussion syndrome, which is a common occurrence in cases of mild traumatic brain injury. The (BC-PSI) asks the respondent to rate the severity of 13 symptoms rated on a six-point Likert-type rating scale that measures the frequency and intensity of each symptom in the past two weeks.

- Frequency ratings range from 0 = “not at all” to 5 = “constantly”.
- Intensity ratings range from 0 = “not at all” to 5 = “very severe problem”.

The two ratings are multiplied (how often × how bad) to create a single score for each item. These product-based scores are then converted to item scores that reflect both the frequency and intensity of symptom endorsement (range = 0–4). Item product scores convert to item total scores:
0–1 = 0, 2–3 = 1, 4–6 = 2, 8–12 = 3, and 15+ = 4.

Item scores of 3> reflect moderate to severe symptom endorsement, Item scores from 1 - 2 reflect mild endorsement of the symptom

BC-PSI items

- Headaches
- Dizziness/light-headed
- Nausea/feeling sick
- Fatigue
- Extra sensitive to noises
- Irritable
- Sadness
- Nervous or tense
- Temper problems
- Poor concentration
- Memory problems
- Difficulty reading
- Poor sleep

== Validity ==
For most patients with MTBI the cognitive, psychological, and psychosocial symptoms do not last longer than three to six months.(Belanger & Vanderploeg, 2005); (Carroll et al., 2004). Those in which the symptoms persist longer may be diagnosed with postconcussion syndrome (Ruff, 2005). PCS is recognised in International Classification of Diseases, 10th edition (ICD-10;(World Health Organization, 1992) and the Diagnostic and Statistical Manual of Mental Disorders, Fourth Edition (DSM-IV;(American Psychiatric Association, 2000). PCS symptoms may include headaches, dizziness, light and noise sensitivity, nausea, fatigue, sleep disturbance, irritability, temper problems, emotional problems, poor concentration, and memory impairment.

Some research has indicated that healthy controls and those seen for psychological services also endorse many of the items on the BC-PSI (Meares et al.., 2008).

The results of a comparison study (Iverson GL. et al. 2010) between a clinician conducted open-ended interview and the self-report (BC-PSI), conducted among patients following a mild traumatic brain injury showed patients endorsed all 13 items on the (BC-PSI) at significantly higher rates.

- open-ended interview; average 3.3 symptoms; 44% endorsed 4 or more symptoms
- BC-PSI: average 9.1 symptoms; 92% endorsed 4 or more symptoms

CONCLUSIONS: Clinicians need to be cautious when interpreting questionnaires and be aware of the possibility of nonspecific symptom endorsement, symptom overendorsement, symptom expectations influencing symptom endorsement, and the nocebo effect.
