= Seasonal effects on suicide rates =

Research on seasonal effects on suicide rates suggests that the prevalence of suicide is greatest during the late spring and early summer months, despite the common belief that suicide rates peak during the cold and dark months of the winter season. From both a behavioral and a biological standpoint, the reasons for this are unclear, but associations between seasonality and other possibly related phenomena have been found.

== General effects ==
The Centers for Disease Control and Prevention and the National Center for Health Statistics report that suicide rates in the United States are lowest during the winter months and highest in the spring and summer. Stephen Bridges asserts that there is "a high incidence in early spring (April and May) and also a low incidence in winter" of suicide rates. Bridges's study focused on seasonal effects on suicide risk by examining the monthly distribution of suicides in the 1970s, 1980s, and 1990s via a "harmonic time series model" with six observable harmonic cycles within each consecutive year. The results show a consistent pattern of suicide risk with most suicides occurring in the spring/summer and the fewest during the winter months. Specifically, Bridges found that in the 1970s "about 47% of the total variances can be explained by the seasonal components" within that given decade (with more suicides in spring/summer). In the 1980s, "the seasonal component of suicide incidence for the time period 1981 through 1990 is clearly significant and records about a 27.7% increase in seasonal contribution by comparison with the previous period". In the 1990s, "the significant seasonal rhythm were explained in 63% of the total variation".

According to Bridges, recent research from industrialized countries (including Finland, Sweden, Australia, New Zealand, England, and Wales) has provided enough information to show a decrease in seasonal effects on suicide rates over the past few decades. In the case of Greece, seasonal variations in mortality from suicide are "more frequent during the spring and summer months…but [have] no regular annual rhythm". The Greek researchers proposed that "the seasonal variation of suicide follows more closely to the seasonal variation of sunshine, rather than the corresponding variation of temperature". Few scientific assessments have focused on seasonal suicide Epidemiology of suicide variations in the southern hemisphere. Studies in Brazil have shown that "the peak number of suicides occurred in spring (November) in men and women of Rio Grande do Sul state and in men of Paraná and Santa Catarina states, and in early summer (January) for women of Paraná state." One international study on seasonal effects on suicide rates involving 20 countries showed an early summer peak in suicides. She concluded that "seasonal variation in suicide incidence could be explained by the increase in sunshine in summer months because of a relationship between sunshine, high temperatures, and suicide rate". Australian researchers found a "spring peak in the number of suicides committed in Brisbane, Australia, but the results were not statistically significant…and that Dublin reported the incidence of suicide varied according to seasons in the northern hemisphere".

French sociologist Émile Durkheim had found similar results, reporting that more suicides occurred in the spring than in the summer. Rather than emphasizing the role of nature, Durkheim interpreted the seasonal variation in sociological terms; he wrote that most suicides took place in the spring because "everything begins to awake; activity is resumed, relations spring up, interchanges increase. In other words, it is the density of human interactions, and not the environment that caused higher incidence of suicide in spring or summer".

== Popular belief ==
Many people believe that suicide rates peak during the winter months. Intuitively, this makes sense given the existence of seasonal affective disorder and the tendency to associate winter with depression. Weather in the colder season increases the prevalence of afflictions such as pneumonia and hypothermia, which largely proceeds from the minimal amount of sunlight exposure in the wintertime. As winter is popularly associated with a decrease in sunlight and an uptick in distempers, so it is by extension with suicide rates. Some also believe that "holiday cheer amplifies loneliness and hopelessness in people who have lost loved ones, or who have high expectations of renewed happiness during the holiday season, only to be disappointed".

== Related factors ==
Suicide attempts as well as other related behaviors and thought processes can be analyzed either exogenously (within the boundaries of social and economic elements) or endogenously (demographic, pathological, clinical, and seasonal aspects).

=== Gender ===
As noted in a study led by Timo Partonen and colleagues, "There was a seasonal effect on suicide occurrence among the study population in Finland, and the risk of suicide was highest in May and lowest in February over the study period"…males with an incidence of 42.56 (N=21,622) and females with an incidence of 10.86 (N=5847). Their findings demonstrate that both male and female suicide rates tend to be higher during the spring and summer months (combined gender inference of: April ~ 27.24; May ~ 30.04; June ~ 28.86; July ~ 27.83) compared to winter (Nov. ~ 25.77; Dec. ~ 23.17; Jan. ~ 24.07; Feb. ~ 23.16). Similar results were reported in Lester and Franks’ article "Sex differences in the seasonal distribution of suicides". These researchers focused on the influence of climate and social integration, in regards to suicide rates categorized by gender. Their data suggest that both genders showed a "bimodal distribution of suicides and the sexes, but did not differ significantly from each other (x@=l2.29, d.f.=ll, P>0.30)". The authors hypothesized that the high summer peaks in suicide deaths are the result of an ultimately disappointed hope amongst the emotionally discomforted that summer might bring an end to the "social isolation and depression brought about by the cold weather". In contrast to these findings, some studies indicate that males have only one peak of suicide during the spring and early summer while women show two peaks of suicide throughout the year, during the spring and fall: "The seasonal distribution of suicides among the 117 males was similar and showed a significant seasonality: spring and summer peaks (33 and 29%, respectively) and fall–winter lows (18% and 20%, respectively, χ2=7.684, d.f.=3, P=0.053)".

=== Biochemistry ===
Biological explanations of seasonal effects on suicide rates tend to focus on seasonal variation in hormone changes and neurotransmitter levels. Chronobiological research, conducted by a team of clinical scientists in Belgium, has revealed that many "biochemical, metabolic and immune functions, which may be related to suicide, suicidal behavior or ideation or major depression, are organized along a multifrequency seasonal time-structure". Evidence was found by calculating "serum total cholesterol concentrations to show a clear seasonality with lower levels in midyear than in winter" Similarly, medical researchers in Pennsylvania indicate that neuropeptides in normal controls have lower serum cholesterol levels and may be related to a higher occurrence of suicide. These findings clearly state that there is a relationship between summer suicide rates and biochemical (e.g., plasma L-TRP and melatonin levels, [3H]paroxetine binding to blood platelets), metabolic (serum total cholesterol, calcium and magnesium concentrations), and immune (number of peripheral blood lymphocytes and serum sIL-2R) variables.

Another study focused on the association between depression, suicide, and the amount of polyunsaturated fatty acids (PUFA). They state that "depression is accompanied by a depletion of n-3 poly-unsaturated fatty acids". Their methodology involved taking periodic blood samples—every month for one year—of healthy volunteers, allowing them to analyze the "PUFA composition in serum phospholipids and [relating] those data to the annual variation in the mean weekly number of suicides". They used an analysis of variance (ANOVA) to document their results, finding that PUFA like arachidonic acid, eicosapentaenoic acid, and docosahexaenoic acid all occurred at significantly lower rates in winter than in summer months. The association between depression, suicide, and PUFA rates is indicative of there being a biological factor in seasonal effects on suicide rates.

=== Environment ===
Environmental variables, such as the amount of sunlight, occurrence of natural disasters, and the inability to protect and shelter oneself, can result in suicidal behaviors. For example, parasuicide, which is the strongest known indicator for a future suicide, is known to have a strong association with weather patterns. As noted by Barker et al. in their 1994 article on seasonal and weather factors in parasuicide, "A major finding of this study was…the greatest mean daily number of parasuicide episodes in late spring/early summer and a trough in December/January". Their approach involved developing a linear model to accurately separate any "seasonal effects and seasonally-related weather effects". Climate factors affect parasuicide differently in women and men. The data indicated that the meteorological factors to account for large parasuicidal effects in women were maximum temperature, rainfall, and cloud cover. On the other hand, rain, cloud cover, poor visibility, and windy days were the most important meteorological factors in men. Additionally, "environmental temperature, wind and humidity together affect the rate of body cooling, with hot, humid, still days decreasing evaporative cooling". These findings state that elevated levels of environmental heat have been known to "produce thermal stress causing physiological and behavioral change, which may predispose a person to parasuicidal behavior, or precipitate parasuicide in someone already considering it".

Along with the Organisation for Economic Co-operation and Development (OECD), Petridou and colleague showed a "consistency of an early summer excess incidence of suicide around the world, and the further association of suicide with hours of sunshine, strongly [suggesting] that a physical environmental factor plays an important role in the triggering of suicide" across twenty OECD countries around the world. All but two of the countries on their list (Australia and New Zealand) showed peaks in suicide rates between April and June; Australia and New Zealand, being the only southern-hemisphere countries in the study, peaked in November or December. Petridou notes that "it is possible that the excess suicide risk during the summer months could be associated with behavioral changes of the persons not attributed directly to sunshine...so that suicide risk could be affected by factors associated with more free time rather than more sunshine". Regarding Australia’s seasonal rates of suicide, studies have confirmed that the country's suicide peak in December and January is also from the number of "bright sunlight hours".

To follow up on Petridou’s concern that a confounding variable may be raising suicide rates in the sunny summer months, another study looked at three north-south strips of neighboring counties along the three time zone lines in the US. The only relevant differences between the counties were their sunset and sunrise times. Residents of counties to the west of the lines, in which sunset and sunrise were an hour earlier, were more likely to wake after sunrise and go to sleep after sunset, affording them an hour less sunlight during waking hours. The suicide rate in these counties was 8% higher than counties to the east of the lines, which was consistent with the hypothesis that sunlight by itself reduces suicide rates.

=== Psychology ===
Psychological disorders can be affected by seasonal changes and result in suicide. There is also a "physiological strain that results from the low ambient temperatures", from which suicidal ideations are considered to stem. Behavioral psychologist Friedrich V. Wenz measured seasonal effects on suicide rates and researched the association between seasonal effects and psychopathology. Wenz "investigated the relation of 2 components of loneliness, present and future loneliness, to seasonality of suicide attempts". Wenz’s empirical literature states that suicide attempts from feelings of loneliness were highest in spring and summer and lowest in winter. On the other hand, "The mean scale scores for present and future loneliness were greatest for spring and winter, the peak seasons for the timing of suicide attempts... persons may actually postpone acts of attempted suicide in order to participate and become emotionally involved in important annual ceremonies".

Patients diagnosed with a mood disorder have shown repetitive rates in a seasonal recurrence of suicide. The seasonal mood disorders that were recurrent in this study are as follows: "depression, 51%, and bipolar disorder, 49%, with 30% of the latter having mania (bipolar disorder type I) and 19% having hypomania (bipolar disorder type II)".

When a mood disorder recurs in a seasonal pattern it is described as a seasonal affective disorder (SAD).

Pendse, Westrin, and Engstrom’s research on the effect of temperament on seasonal affective disorder and suicide attempts determined that "the suicidal behavior of SAD patients is not a prominent problem, even though SAD patients often present suicidal ideation". Pendse and colleagues compared a small sample of patients who suffered from seasonal affective disorder and also hospitalized suicide attempters who had experienced "non-seasonal major depression" by using the Comprehensive Psychopathological Rating Scale (CPRS). Results state that the SAD control group had a significant probability of scoring higher on non-psychotic tests than the non-SAD suicide attempters—when both groups were analyzed for items such as "hostile feelings, indecision (negatively), lassitude, failing memory, increased sleep, muscular tension, loss of sensation or movement, and disrupted thoughts, and the observed items were perplexity, slowness of movement (negatively), and agitation".

== See also ==
- Circadian rhythm
- List of sovereign states by suicide rate
