= Journal of Photochemistry and Photobiology =

- Discipline: Photobiology, photochemistry
- Language: English

Publication details
- History: J. Photochem. (1972–1987); J. Photochem. Photobiol. A (1987–present); J. Photochem. Photobiol. B (1987–present); J. Photochem. Photobiol. C (2000–present)
- Publisher: Elsevier
- Frequency: A: biweekly B: monthly C: quarterly
- Impact factor: A: 4.291; B: 6.252; C: 12.927 (2020)

Standard abbreviations
- ISO 4: J. Photochem. Photobiol.

Indexing
- J. Photochem.
- CODEN: JPCMAE
- ISSN: 0047-2670
- LCCN: 73641837
- OCLC no.: 49854039
- J. Photochem. Photobiol. A
- CODEN: JPPCEJ
- ISSN: 1010-6030
- LCCN: 92641849
- OCLC no.: 780616293
- J. Photochem. Photobiol. B
- CODEN: JPPBEG
- ISSN: 1011-1344
- LCCN: 88648144
- OCLC no.: 231031125
- J. Photochem. Photobiol. C
- CODEN: JPPCAF
- ISSN: 1389-5567
- LCCN: 00242132
- OCLC no.: 612266841

Links
- A: online access; B: online access; C: online access; J. Photochem. online archive (1972–1987)

The Journal of Photochemistry and Photobiology is a series of peer-reviewed scientific journals covering the fields of photochemistry and photobiology, published by Elsevier. It was originally established in 1972, and split into Journal of Photochemistry and Photobiology A: Chemistry and Journal of Photochemistry and Photobiology B: Biology in 1987. A third title; Journal of Photochemistry and Photobiology C: Photochemistry Reviews, was established in 2000 and is the official journal of the Japanese Photochemistry Association.

== History ==
The Journal of Photochemistry was established in 1972 under founding editor-in-chief Richard P. Wayne. Originally published quarterly, by 1987 frequency had increased to monthly.

In 1986, the 38th Council of the American Society for Photobiology (ASP) established a committee to investigate the proposal that the European Society for Photobiology (ESP) share the operation of the ASP official journal, Photochemistry and Photobiology. In 1987, financial and contractual problems prevented agreement and, instead, ESP contracted with Elsevier, leading to the restructuring of the Journal of Photochemistry into two separate journals: the Journal of Photochemistry and Photobiology A: Chemistry, continuing under Richard P. Wayne and covering photochemistry and the Journal of Photochemistry and Photobiology B: Biology under founding editor Giulio Jori, covering photobiology.

The Journal of Photochemistry and Photobiology C: Photochemistry Reviews was first published in 2000 with Akira Fujishima as founding editor-in-chief. When the journal was first established, it aimed to increase from two issues a year to four, an objective achieved and maintained since 2003.

== Journal of Photochemistry and Photobiology A: Chemistry ==
The Journal of Photochemistry and Photobiology A: Chemistry is published biweekly. There is no editor-in-chief; editorial responsibility is shared and divided geographically with Hiroshi Masuhara covering Asia, Russ Schmehl covering America, and Monique Martin covering Europe.

=== Abstracting and indexing ===
The Journal of Photochemistry and Photobiology A: Chemistry is abstracted and indexed in BIOSIS Previews, Chemical Abstracts, Chemical Citation Index, Current Contents/Physics, Chemistry & Engineering, Engineering Index, Metals Abstracts, PASCAL, Physics Abstracts, Physikalische Berichte, Polymer Contents, Science Citation Index and Scopus. According to the Journal Citation Reports, the journal has a 2019 impact factor of 3.261.

== Journal of Photochemistry and Photobiology B: Biology ==
The Journal of Photochemistry and Photobiology B: Biology is published monthly. The editors are Robert Carpentier and Dominic J. Robinson. Carpentier covers the fields of biophysics, biomolecular spectroscopy, photosynthesis, environmental photobiology, oxygen radicals, DNA repair, and UV-/VIS effects. Robinson covers photomedicine, photodynamic therapy, photosensitisers and dermatology.

=== Abstracting and indexing ===
The Journal of Photochemistry and Photobiology B: Biology is abstracted and indexed in BIOSIS, Cambridge Scientific Abstracts, Chemical Abstracts, Current Contents, BIOBASE/Current Awareness in Biological Sciences, EMBASE, Embiology, Engineering Index, Metals Abstracts, PASCAL, Physics Abstracts, Physikalische Berichte, Polymer Contents, Science Citation Index, and Scopus. According to the Journal Citation Reports, the journal has a 2016 impact factor of 2.673.

== Journal of Photochemistry and Photobiology C: Photochemistry Reviews ==
Journal of Photochemistry and Photobiology C: Photochemistry Reviews focusses on photochemistry literature reviews. It is the official journal of the Japanese Photochemistry Association and is published quarterly. The editor-in-chief is Hiroaki Misawa.

=== Abstracting and indexing ===
The Journal of Photochemistry and Photobiology C: Photochemistry Reviews is abstracted and indexed in BIOSIS Previews, Chemistry & Chemical Engineering, Chemistry Citation Index, Current Contents/Physical, Chemical & Earth Sciences, Science Citation Index and Scopus. According to the Journal Citation Reports, the journal has a 2014 impact factor of 16.094.

== See also ==
- Photochemistry and Photobiology
- Photochemical and Photobiological Sciences
- Photodermatology, Photoimmunology and Photomedicine
