= Photodermatology, Photoimmunology and Photomedicine =

- Discipline: Photomedicine
- Language: English
- Edited by: Warwick L. Morison

Publication details
- History: 1985-present
- Publisher: Wiley-Blackwell
- Frequency: Bimonthly
- Impact factor: 1.259 (2014)

Standard abbreviations
- ISO 4: Photodermatol. Photoimmunol. Photomed.

Indexing
- ISSN: 0905-4383 (print); 1600-0781 (web)
- OCLC no.: 47833409

Links
- Journal homepage; Online access

Photodermatology, Photoimmunology and Photomedicine is a peer-reviewed scientific journal published bimonthly by Wiley-Blackwell which focusses, as its title implies, on photodermatology, photoimmunology and photomedicine. Warwick L. Morison is editor-in-chief. It is the official journal of the Photomedicine Society, the British Photodermatology Group, and the European Society for Photodermatology.

== History ==
Photodermatology, Photoimmunology and Photomedicine has been published since 1985. The founding editors were Christer Jansén and Gören Wennersten, other past editors in chief have been Henry Wan-Peng Lim. and Paul R. Bergstresser.

In 2008 the European Society for Photodermatology voted to make Photodermatology, Photoimmunology and Photomedicine its official journal.

== Abstracting and indexing ==
Photodermatology, Photoimmunology and Photomedicine is abstracted and indexed in Academic Search, Biological Abstracts, BIOSIS Previews, Current Contents/Clinical Medicine, CSA Biological Sciences Database, Immunological Abstracts, EMBASE, Journal Citation Reports, MEDLINE/PubMed, Research Alert, and the Science Citation Index. According to the Journal Citation Reports, the journal has a 2014 impact factor of 1.259, ranking it 40th out of 63 journals in the category "Dermatology".

== See also ==
- Journal of Photochemistry and Photobiology
- Photochemical and Photobiological Sciences
- Photochemistry and Photobiology
