= Pill-Soon Song =

- Born: August 5, 1936; Osaka, Japan
- Scientific career
- Fields: Photobiology
- Workplaces: Dow Chemical Professor(Emeritus), Department of Chemistry, Univ. of Nebraska-Lincoln, Lincoln, USA, and Distinguished Chair Professor, Faculty of Biotechnology, Jeju National University, Jeju, Korea
- Doctoral students: Minjoong Yoon

Pill-Soon Song is a professor in Jeju National University, Jeju, Korea. Song specializes in molecular photobiology. He worked on the structure-function relation of phytochromes and other photoreceptors including stentorin and blepharismin. Presently, his research revolves around the molecular mechanisms involved in overexpression of phytochrome and its related genes in turfgrass and other plant species. Acknowledging his contributions to photobiology, he was elected as editor-in-chief for the American Society for Photobiology journal, Photochemistry and Photobiology (1975–1994) and received the Finsen Medal in 2009 awarded by the International Union of Photobiology.

== Life and education ==
Born in Osaka, Japan, he studied agricultural chemistry (Bachelor of Science, 1959) at Seoul National University. and pursued postgraduate studies, receiving a (Master of Science, 1961) at Seoul National University. He received his PhD from University of California, Davis in 1964. After a post-doctoral research fellowship at Iowa State University under Prof. David E. Metzler from 1964 to 1965, he then joined Texas Tech Univ, Lubbock, Texas, US, as assistant professor in chemistry.

== Awards and honors ==
Among Song's awards and honours are:

- 1975-1987 Paul Whitfield Horn Professorship, Texas Tech Univ., Lubbock, Texas
- 1978 Faculty Distinguished Published Research Award, Texas Tech Univ. DADS Association & Hemphill Wells Foundation, Plaque and Award
- 1979 Faculty Research Award, College of Arts and Sciences, Texas Tech Univ., Lubbock, Texas, Plaque and Award
- 1990-2003 Dow Chemical Company Distinguished Professorship, UNL
- 1991 Outstanding Research Award, American Society for Photobiology (based on work published through 1989/90)
- 1996 Member (Elected), Korean Academy of Science and Technology
- 1996 Outstanding Alumni Achievement Award, 90th Anniversary of the College of Agriculture and Life Sciences, Seoul National Univ., October 1997
- 1997 Life Member (Elected), Korean Academy of Science and Technology
- 1997 Outstanding Research Achievement Medal, European Society for Photobiology, presented at the 1997 ESP Congress, Stresa, Italy, September, 1997.
- 1998 Univ. of Hasanuddin Univ. Presidential Medal, Photobiology Contributions, Ujung Pandang, Indonesia, September, 1998
- 2000 Lifetime Achievement Award, American Society for Photobiology/13th International Congress on Photobiology, San Francisco, July 1–6, 2000
- 2000 Outstanding Research and Creative Activity Award, State of Nebraska/Univ. of Nebraska, Lincoln, March 29, 2000
- 2000 Ho-Am Prize in Science, The Ho-Am Foundation/Samsung Corporation, June 1, 2000
- 2007 Outstanding Alumnus, Hall of Fame, Seoul Natl Univ. College of Agriculture and Life Sciences
- 2009 Finsen Medal in Photobiology, International Union of Photobiology, June 18, 2009
