= Photochemistry and Photobiology =

- Discipline: Photochemistry, photobiology
- Language: English
- Edited by: Alexander Greer

Publication details
- History: 1962–present
- Publisher: Wiley-Blackwell on behalf of the American Society for Photobiology
- Frequency: Bimonthly
- Impact factor: 2.6 (2023)

Standard abbreviations
- ISO 4: Photochem. Photobiol.

Indexing
- CODEN: PHCBAP
- ISSN: 0031-8655 (print); 1751-1097 (web)
- LCCN: 64009186
- OCLC no.: 01762302

Links
- Journal homepage; Online access; Online archive

Photochemistry and Photobiology is a bimonthly peer-reviewed scientific journal covering photochemistry and photobiology. It was established in 1962 and is pub lished by Wiley-Blackwell on behalf of the American Society for Photobiology. The editor-in-chief is Alexander Greer (Brooklyn College).

== History ==
The journal's name was decided in Copenhagen at the 1960 International Congress on Photobiology. The journal has been published since 1962, originally by Pergamon Press under Robert Maxwell, who personally agreed to give the journal to the American Society for Photobiology (ASP), soon after its formation in 1972, and it has been the society's official journal ever since.

In 1986, the 38th Council of the ASP established a committee to investigate the proposal that the European Society for Photobiology (ESP) would share the operation of the journal with the ASP. Financial and contractual problems prevented agreement and, instead, ESP contracted with Elsevier leading to the publication of the Journal of Photochemistry and Photobiology in 1987.

After the widespread challenge of falling journal subscription revenues, the journal was an early participant in the not-for-profit publishing initiative, BioOne.

== Abstracting and indexing ==
The journal is abstracted and indexed in Academic Search, Biological Abstracts, BIOSIS Previews, CAB HEALTH, CABDirect, Chemical Abstracts Service, CSA Biological Sciences Database, Current Contents/Life Sciences, GeoRef, Index Medicus/MEDLINE/PubMed, ProQuest Health & Medical Complete, Proquest Medical Library, and the Science Citation Index. According to the Journal Citation Reports, the journal has a 2017 impact factor of 2.214.

== See also ==
- Photochemical and Photobiological Sciences
- Journal of Photochemistry and Photobiology
- Photodermatology, Photoimmunology and Photomedicine
