= Minjoong Yoon =

South Korean chemist and professor (born 1948)

- Born: October 10, 1948; Seoul, South Korea
- Died: June 20, 2025; Daejon, South Korea
- Scientific career
- Fields: Chemistry
- Workplaces: Research Institute of Materials Chemistry; Laboratory for Molecular-Nano Photochemistry and Photonics; Chungnam National University
- Thesis: Photosensory transduction in Stentor coeruleus: Liposome model systems (1981)
- Doctoral advisor: Pill-Soon Song

Minjoong Yoon (born September 8, 1948) was a South Korean chemist and professor.

== Chemistry ==
Yoon specialized in nano and molecular scale photochemistry and photonics. He is well known for the studies of space and time resolved fluorescence/Raman spectroscopy that has been conducted at the Laboratory for Molecular-Nano Photochemistry and Photonics in Chungnam National University. Acknowledging his contribution to chemistry, he was elected the 43rd president of The Korean Chemical Society in 2007 and held the position until 2009. In 2009, he also was elected as the president of The Korean Union of Chemical Science and Technology Societies. He served the president of Asia-Oceania Photochemistry Association from 2011 to 2012. He is an editorial advisory board member for the Journal of Photochemistry and Photobiology C-Photochemistry Review after serving editorial board member from 2001 to 2013. He served as an editorial board member for the Journal of Photochemistry and Photobiology A-Chemistry from 2004 to 2016. He has been an associate editor of the journal, Photochemical and Photobiological Sciences since 2006.

== Life and education ==
Born in Seoul, South Korea, Yoon studied chemistry education (Bachelor of Science, 1971) at Seoul National University. Instead of becoming a highschool teacher, his research interest in chemistry led him to pursue postgraduate studies (Master of Science, 1974) at Sogang University. Yoon continued the graduate study under Dr. Pill-soon Song and received Ph.D in chemistry from Texas Tech University in 1981. After the post-doctoral research fellowships at Columbia University College of Physicians and Surgeons and Harvard Medical School from 1981 to 1982, Yoon returned to Korea to become a faculty member of Department of Chemistry of Chungnam National University.

== Awards and honors ==
Among Yoon's awards and honors are:

- Excellent Exemplary Student Award (Minister of Education of Republic of Korea) (1970)
- International Scientist Exchange Award (Canada National Science and Engineering Research Council (NSERC)) (1987)
- Excellent Research Professor Award (Chungnam National University) (2002)
- IPJAE Physical Chemistry Award (Korean Chemical Society) (2003)
- Scientific Research Award (Korean Society of Photosciences) (2003)
- APA (Asia-Oceania Photochemistry Association) Award for Distinguished Achievements (2008)
- Lectureship Award (Chemistry Research Promotion Center, National Science Council, Taiwan) (2008)
- Order of Service Merit (Aquamarine Stripes, Republic of Korea) (2014)
- Jangyoungsil International Science Culture Prize (2014)
