= Skubic =

Skubic is a Slovene surname. Notable people with this surname include:

- Andrej E. Skubic (born 1967), Slovene writer, playwright and translator
- Michelle C. Skubic (born c. 1966), United States Navy admiral
- Nejc Skubic (born 1989), Slovene footballer
- Vera Skubic (1921–1998), one of the builders of Hodgkins and Skubic House
