= John Woodland Hastings =

American biologist

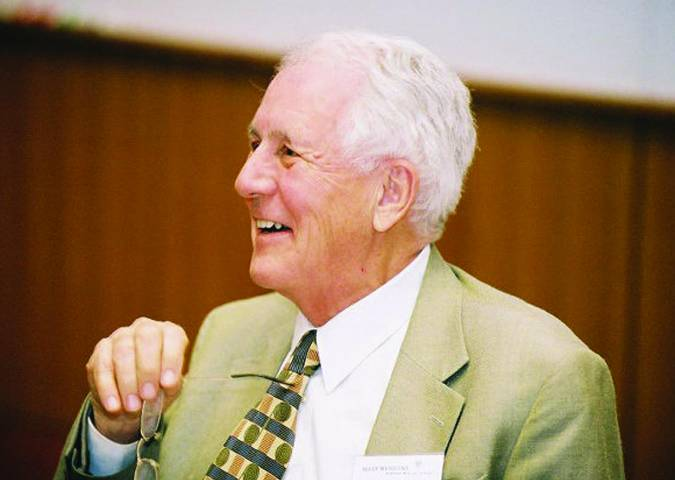
- Born: March 24, 1927; Salisbury, Maryland
- Died: August 6, 2014 (aged 87); Lexington, Massachusetts
- Citizenship: United States
- Education: Swarthmore College, 1944-1947; BA 1947 (Navy V-12 medical officers training program) Princeton University, 1948-1951; M.A. 1950, PhD. 1951 Johns Hopkins University, 1951-1953 Postdoctoral Fellow
- Known for: Founding circadian biology
- Awards: NATO Senior Fellow in Science, Foundation Curie, Orsay, France, 1977
- Scientific career
- Fields: Bioluminescence, Circadian rhythms
- Workplaces: Instructor in Biological Sciences Northwestern University 1953-1957 Assistant Professor of Biochemistry University of Illinois 1957-1966 Professor of Biology Harvard University, 1966-1986; Paul C. Mangelsdorf Professor of Natural Sciences Harvard University 1986 - 2014
- Thesis: Oxygen concentration and bioluminescence intensity (1951)
- Doctoral advisor: E. Newton Harvey
- Other academic advisors: William D. McElroy

John Woodland "Woody" Hastings, (March 24, 1927 – August 6, 2014) was a leader in the field of photobiology, especially bioluminescence, and was one of the founders of the field of circadian biology (the study of circadian rhythms, or the sleep-wake cycle). He was the Paul C. Mangelsdorf Professor of Natural Sciences and Professor of Molecular and Cellular Biology at Harvard University. He published over 400 papers and co-edited three books.

Hastings research on bioluminescence principally focused on bacterial luminescence (over 150 papers) and dinoflagellates (over 80 papers). In addition to bacteria and dinoflagellates, he, with his students and colleagues, also published papers on the biochemical and molecular mechanisms of light production in fungi, cnidarians, ctenophores, polychaetes, insects (fireflies and dipterans), ostracod crustaceans, millipedes, tunicates, and fishes with bacterial light organs. His laboratory produced the first evidence for quorum sensing in bacteria, early evidence of the molecular mechanisms of circadian clock regulation in organisms (first using dinoflagellate luminescence and then expanded to other cellular proteins), and some of the initial studies of energy transfer in green fluorescent proteins (GFP) in cnidarian luminescence.

== Early life ==
Hastings lived in Seaford, Delaware, during his early childhood; in 1937, he joined the choir at the Cathedral of St. John the Divine and attended the choir's in-house boarding school, visiting his family during vacations. Hastings moved to Lenox School in Lenox, Massachusetts, in 1941 to complete his secondary education and was interested in literature, physics, mathematics, ice hockey and basketball.

== Awards and honors ==
Throughout his career Hastings received numerous awards and honors:

- Guggenheim Fellow, 1965;
- Elected to the Johns Hopkins Society of Scholars, 1969;
- Elected to the American Academy of Arts and Sciences, 1972;
- NATO Senior Fellow in Science, Foundation Curie, Orsay, France, 1977;
- Alexander von Humboldt Fellow, Bonn, Germany 1979-80 and 1993;
- Yamada Foundation Fellow, Osaka, Japan, 1986;
- NIMH Merit Award, 1990 and 1994;
- Fellow of the American Academy of Microbiology, 2003;
- American Society for Photobiology Lifetime Achievement Award, 2003;
- Elected to the National Academy of Sciences, 2003;
- Recipient of the Farrell Prize in Sleep Medicine for his contributions to and for founding the field of circadian rhythms, 2006.

== Career ==
Hastings began his graduate studies at Princeton University in 1948 in the laboratory of E. Newton Harvey, the world leader of luminescence studies at the time, and focused on the role of oxygen in the luminescence of bacteria, fireflies, ostracod crustaceans and fungi. He received his PhD in 1951. He then joined the lab of William D. McElroy, another student of Harvey’s, at Johns Hopkins University where he discovered both the stimulatory effects of coenzyme A and gating control by oxygen of firefly luminescence, and that flavin is a substrate in bacterial luminescence.

In 1953 he joined the faculty in the Department of Biological Sciences at Northwestern University. In 1954 he began a long collaboration with Beatrice M. Sweeney, who was then at the Scripps Institution of Oceanography, in elucidating the cellular and biochemical mechanisms of luminescence in the unicellular dinoflagellate Lingulodinium polyedrum (formerly known as Gonyaulax polyedra). A byproduct of this initial research was their discovery of circadian control of the luminescence.

In 1957, Hastings next took a faculty position in the Biochemistry Division of the Chemistry Department at the University of Illinois at Urbana–Champaign where he continued his focus on dinoflagellate and bacterial luminescence and dinoflagellate circadian rhythms. Hastings joined the faculty of Harvard University as Professor of Biology in 1966. During this period he continued and expanded his studies of circadian rhythms in dinoflagellates and luminescence in bacteria, dinoflagellates and other organisms. He was elected to the National Academy of Sciences in 2003 and received the Farrell Prize in Sleep Medicine for his work on circadian rhythms in 2006.

For over 50 years he also had an affiliation with the Marine Biological Laboratory in Woods Hole, Massachusetts. He was the director of the Physiology Course there from 1962 to 1966, and served as a trustee from 1966 to 1970.

== Research Interests ==
Luminescent Bacteria: Hastings' investigations of luminous bacteria acted as a catalyst for the discoveries of the biochemical mechanisms involved in their light production, the discovery of a flavin to be a substrate in its luciferase reaction, the determination of gene regulation of the luciferases, and the first evidence for quorum sensing, a form of bacterial communication. In quorum sensing (initially termed autoinduction), the bacteria release a substance into the medium, the autoinducer. Once the concentration of this substance reaches a critical level (a measure of the number of bacteria in a limited area), transcription of specific other genes that had been repressed are turned on. Once the sequenced autoinducer gene was found to occur widely in gram-negative bacteria quorum sensing became accepted in the early 1990s. It is now known that in many pathogenic bacteria, there is delayed production of toxins, which serve to greatly augment their pathogenicity, this is similar to what happens for luciferase proteins. By curtailing their toxin output until the bacterial populations are substantial, these bacteria can generate massive quantities of toxin quickly and thereby swamp the defences of the host.

Luminescent Dinoflagellates: In early 1954 at Northwestern University, Hastings, his students and colleagues studied cellular and molecular aspects of bioluminescence in dinoflagellates [especially Lingulodinium polyedrum (formerly Gonyaulax polyedra)]. They elucidated the structures of the luciferins and luciferases, the organization and regulation of their associated genes, temporal control mechanisms, and the actual sub-cellular identity and location of the light emitting elements, which they termed scintillons. They demonstrated that the reaction is controlled by a drop in pH when an action potential leads to the entry of protons via voltage-activated membrane channels in the scintillons. Through immunolocalization studies the Hastings lab showed that scintillons are small peripheral vesicles (0.4 μm) that contain both the luciferase and the luciferin-binding protein. More recently, the lab found that the luciferase gene in Lingulodinium polyedrum and other closely related species contains three homologous and contiguous repeated sequences in a kind of "three-ring circus with the same act in all three." However, another luminescent, but heterotrophic, dinoflagellate, Noctiluca scintillans, has but a single protein, which appears to possess both catalytic and substrate binding properties in a single, rather than separate proteins.

Dinoflagellate Circadian Rhythms: Using Lingulodinium polyedrum as a model, Hastings spearheaded our understanding of the molecular mechanisms involved in control of circadian rhythms, which in humans are involved in sleep, jet-lag and other daily activities. His lab has shown that the rhythm of bioluminescence involves a daily synthesis and destruction of proteins. Because the mRNAs that code for these proteins remain unchanged from day to night, the synthesis of these proteins is controlled at the translational level. This work has now been expanded to other proteins in the cell. On the other hand, short pulses of inhibitors of synthesis of these proteins results in phase shifts of the circadian rhythm, either delays or advances, depending when the pulse is administered. At still another level, protein phosphorylation inhibitors also influence the period of the rhythm.

Other luminescent systems: Early in his career Hastings developed techniques to quantify the level of oxygen required in a luminescent reaction for several different species including bacteria, fungi, fireflies and ostracod crustaceans. This work showed that oxygen gating is the mechanism for firefly flashing. In other work when he was in the McElroy lab he examined the basic biochemical mechanism of firefly luciferase and demonstrated that coenzyme A stimulates light emission. His lab first demonstrated that the green in vivo coelenterate bioluminescence occurs because of energy transfer from the luminescent molecule (aequorin), which alone emits blue light, to a secondary green emitter which they termed green fluorescent protein (GFP). Once characterized and cloned, GFP has become a crucial molecule used as a reporter and tagging tool for studying gene activation and developmental patterns. Osamu Shimomura, Martin Chalfie and Roger Tsien received the Nobel Prize in Chemistry in 2008 for their work on this remarkable molecule.

== Death ==
Hastings died of pulmonary fibrosis on August 6, 2014, at Lexington, Massachusetts.

== Publications ==
- Publications by J.W. Hastings

Selected publications:

- Hastings, J.W. (2007). "The Gonyaulax clock at 50: translational control of circadian expression". Cold Spring Harb Symp Quant Biol. 72 (1): 141–144. doi:10.1101/sqb.2007.72.026. PMID 18419271.
- Hastings, J.W.; Morin, J.G. (2006). "Photons for reporting molecular events: green fluorescent protein and four luciferase systems". Green Fluorescent Protein: Properties, Applications, and Protocols. Methods of Biochemical Analysis. Vol. 47 (2nd ed.). pp. 15–38. doi:10.1002/0471739499.ch2. ISBN 9780471739494. PMID 16335708.
- Nealson, K.H.; Hastings, J.W. (2006). "Quorum sensing on a global scale: massive numbers of bioluminescent bacteria make milky seas". Appl. Environ. Microbiol. 72 (4): 2295–2297. Bibcode:2006ApEnM..72.2295N. doi:10.1128/aem.72.4.2295-2297.2006. PMC 1448986. PMID 16597922.
- Liu, L.; Wilson, T.; Hastings, J.W. (2004). "Molecular evolution of dinoflagellate luciferases, enzymes with three catalytic domains in a single polypeptide". Proc. Natl. Acad. Sci. USA. 101 (47): 16555–16560. Bibcode:2004PNAS..10116555L. doi:10.1073/pnas.0407597101. PMC 534537. PMID 15545598.
- Okamoto, OK; Hastings, JW (December 2003). "Genome-wide analysis of redox-regulated genes in a dinoflagellate". Gene. 321: 73–81. doi:10.1016/j.gene.2003.07.003. PMID 14636994.
- Okamoto, OK; Hastings, JW (2003). "Novel dinoflagellate clock-related genes identified through microarray analysis". Journal of Phycology. 39 (3): 519–526. Bibcode:2003JPcgy..39..519O. doi:10.1046/j.1529-8817.2003.02170.x. S2CID 83666855.
- Viviani, V.R.; Hastings, J.W.; Wilson, T. (2002). "Two bioluminescent Diptera: the North American Orfelia fultoni and the Australian Arachnocampa flava. Similar niche, different bioluminescence systems". Photochem. Photobiol. 75 (1): 22–27. doi:10.1562/0031-8655(2002)075<0022:tbdtna>2.0.co;2. PMID 11837324. S2CID 198153893.
- Okamoto, OK; Liu, L; Robertson, DL; Hastings, JW (December 2001). "Members of a dinoflagellate luciferase gene family differ in synonymous substitution rates". Biochemistry. 40 (51): 15862–8. doi:10.1021/bi011651q. PMID 11747464.
- Okamoto, OK; Robertson, DL; Fagan, TF; Hastings, JW; Colepicolo, P (June 2001). "Different regulatory mechanisms modulate the expression of a dinoflagellate iron-superoxide dismutase". J. Biol. Chem. 276 (23): 19989–93. doi:10.1074/jbc.M101169200. PMID 11264289.
- Hastings, J.W. and Wood, K.V. (2001) Luciferases did not all evolve from precursors having similar enzymatic properties. pp. 199–210, In, Photobiology 2000 (D. Valenzeno and T. Coohill, eds.) Valdenmar Publ. Co., Overland Park, KS.
- Hastings, J.W. (2001). "Fifty years of fun". J. Biol. Rhythms. 16 (1): 5–18. doi:10.1177/074873040101600102. PMID 11220778. S2CID 35410216.
- Hastings, J.W.; Greenberg, E.P. (1999). "Quorum Sensing: The explanation of a curious phenomenon reveals a common characteristic of bacteria". J. Bacteriol. 181 (9): 2667–2668. doi:10.1128/JB.181.9.2667-2668.1999. PMC 93702. PMID 10217751.
- Comolli, J.; Hastings, J. W. (1999). "Novel Effects on The Gonyaulax Circadian System Produced by the Protein Kinase Inhibitor Staurosporine". J. Biol. Rhythms. 14 (1): 10–18. doi:10.1177/074873099129000399. PMID 10036988. S2CID 16522583.
- Wilson, T.; Hastings, J.W. (1998). "Bioluminescence". Annu. Rev. Cell Dev. Biol. 14 (1): 197–230. doi:10.1146/annurev.cellbio.14.1.197. PMID 9891783.
- Hastings, J. W. (1996). "Chemistries and colors of bioluminescent reactions: a review". Gene. 173 (1 Spec No): 5–11. doi:10.1016/0378-1119(95)00676-1. PMID 8707056.
- Morse, D.; Milos, P.M.; Roux, E.; Hastings, J.W. (1989). "Circadian regulation of the synthesis of substrate binding protein in the Gonyaulax. bioluminescent system involves translational control". Proc. Natl. Acad. Sci. USA. 86 (1): 172–176. doi:10.1073/pnas.86.1.172. PMC 286426. PMID 2911566.
- Nicolas, M-T.; Nicolas, G.; Johnson, C.H.; Bassot, J-M.; Hastings, J.W. (1987). "Characterization of the bioluminescent organelles in Gonyaulax polyedra. (dinoflagellates) after fast-freeze freeze fixation and antiluciferase immunogold staining". J. Cell Biol. 105 (2): 723–735. doi:10.1083/jcb.105.2.723. PMC 2114768. PMID 2442172.
- Johnson, C.H.; Hastings, J.W. (1986). "The elusive mechanism of the circadian clock". American Scientist. 74 (1): 29–36. Bibcode:1986AmSci..74...29H.
- Hastings, J.W. (1983). "Biological diversity, chemical mechanisms and evolutionary origins of bioluminescent systems". Journal of Molecular Evolution. 19 (5): 309–321. Bibcode:1983JMolE..19..309H. doi:10.1007/bf02101634. PMID 6358519. S2CID 875590.
- Taylor, W.R.; Dunlap, J.C.; Hastings, J.W. (1982). "Inhibitors of protein synthesis on 80s ribosomes phase shift the Gonyaulax. clock". J. Exp. Biol. 97 (1): 121–136. Bibcode:1982JExpB..97..121T. doi:10.1242/jeb.97.1.121. PMID 7201003.
- Dunlap, J.; Hastings, J.W. (1981). "The biological clock in Gonyaulax. controls luciferase activity by regulating turnover". J. Biol. Chem. 256 (20): 10509–10518. doi:10.1016/S0021-9258(19)68651-5. PMID 7197271.
- Nealson, K.H.; Hastings, J.W. (1979). "Bacterial bioluminescence: Its control and ecological significance". Microbiol. Rev. 43 (4): 396–518. doi:10.1128/mmbr.43.4.496-518.1979. PMC 281490. PMID 396467.
- McMurry, L.; Hastings, J.W. (1972). "Circadian rhythms: mechanism of luciferase activity changes in Gonyaulax". Biol. Bull. 143 (1): 196–206. doi:10.2307/1540339. JSTOR 1540339. PMID 5049021.
- Fogel, M.; Hastings, J.W. (1972). "Bioluminescence: Mechanism and mode of control of scintillon activity". Proc. Natl. Acad. Sci. 69 (3): 690–693. Bibcode:1972PNAS...69..690F. doi:10.1073/pnas.69.3.690. PMC 426536. PMID 4501583.
- Morin, J.G.; Hastings, J.W. (1971). "Energy transfer in a bioluminescent system". J. Cell. Physiol. 77 (3): 313–318. doi:10.1002/jcp.1040770305. PMID 4397528. S2CID 42494355.
- Nealson, K.; Platt, T.; Hastings, J.W. (1970). "The cellular control of the synthesis and activity of the bacterial luminescent system". J. Bacteriol. 104 (1): 313–322. doi:10.1128/JB.104.1.313-322.1970. PMC 248216. PMID 5473898.
- Wilson, T. and Hastings, J.W. (1970) Chemical and biological aspects of singlet excited molecular oxygen. Photophysiology (A.C. Giese, ed.), Vol. V, pp. 49–95, Acad. Press, NY.
- Hastings, J.W.; Mitchell, G.W.; Mattingly, P.H.; Blinks, J.R.; Van Leeuwen, M. (1969). "Response of aequorin bioluminescence to rapid changes in calcium concentration". Nature. 222 (5198): 1047–1050. Bibcode:1969Natur.222.1047H. doi:10.1038/2221047a0. PMID 4389183. S2CID 4182048.
- Hastings, J.W. Bioluminescence. (1968) Annu. Rev. Biochem. 37: 597-630.
- Krieger, N.; Hastings, J.W. (1968). "Bioluminescence: pH activity profiles of related luciferase fractions". Science. 161 (3841): 586–589. Bibcode:1968Sci...161..586K. doi:10.1126/science.161.3841.586. PMID 5663301. S2CID 40295305.
- Hastings, J.W.; Gibson, Q.H. (1963). "Intermediates in the bioluminescent oxidation of reduced flavin mononucleotide". J. Biol. Chem. 238 (7): 2537–2554. doi:10.1016/S0021-9258(19)68004-X. PMID 13960925.
- Bode, V.C.; DeSa, R.J.; Hastings, J.W. (1963). "Daily rhythm in luciferin activity in Gonyaulax polyedra". Science. 141 (3584): 913–915. Bibcode:1963Sci...141..913B. doi:10.1126/science.141.3584.913. PMID 17844013. S2CID 11378699.
- DeSa, R.J.; Hastings, J.W.; Vatter, A.E. (1963). "Luminescent "crystalline" particles: An organized subcellular bioluminescent system". Science. 141 (3587): 1269–1270. Bibcode:1963Sci...141.1269D. doi:10.1126/science.141.3587.1269. PMID 14059774. S2CID 34981177.
- Hastings, J.W. (1959). "Unicellular clocks". Annu. Rev. Microbiol. 13 (1): 297–312. doi:10.1146/annurev.mi.13.100159.001501.
- Hastings, J.W.; Sweeney, B.M. (1957). "The luminescent reaction in extracts of the marine dinoflagellate Gonyaulax polyedra". J. Cell. Comp. Physiol. 49 (2): 209–226. doi:10.1002/jcp.1030490205. PMID 13481063.
- Sweeney, B.M.; Hastings, J.W. (1957). "Characteristics of the diurnal rhythm of luminescence in Gonyaulax polyedra". J. Cell. Comp. Physiol. 49 (1): 115–128. doi:10.1002/jcp.1030490107.
- McElroy, W.D.; Hastings, J.W.; Sonnenfeld, V.; Coulombre, J. (1953). "The requirement of riboflavin-phosphate for bacterial luminescence". Science. 118 (3066): 385–386. Bibcode:1953Sci...118..385M. doi:10.1126/science.118.3066.385. PMID 13101761.
- Hastings, J.W.; McElroy, W.D.; Coulombre, J. (1953). "The effect of oxygen upon the immobilization reaction in firefly luminescence". J. Cell. Comp. Physiol. 42 (1): 137–150. doi:10.1002/jcp.1030420109. PMID 13084711.
- Hastings, J.W. (1952b). "Oxygen concentration and bioluminescence intensity II: Cypridina hilgendorfii". J. Cell. Comp. Physiol. 40 (1): 1–9. doi:10.1002/jcp.1030400102. PMID 12981130.
- Hastings, J.W. (1952a). "Oxygen concentration and bioluminescence intensity. I: Bacteria and fungi". J. Cell. Comp. Physiol. 39 (1): 1–30. doi:10.1002/jcp.1030390102. PMID 14907815.
