= Beatrice M. Sweeney =

American plant physiologist and circadian rhythms researcher (1914–1989)

- Born: August 11, 1914; Boston, Massachusetts, United States
- Died: July 17, 1989 (aged 74); Falmouth, Massachusetts
- Education: Smith College
- Known for: Founding circadian biology
- Spouse: Paul Lee
- Scientific career
- Fields: Plant Physiology; Circadian Rhythms; Protistology
- Workplaces: Radcliffe College; Scripps Institution of Oceanography; Yale University; University of California, Santa Barbara
- Thesis: A Study Of The Effect Of Auxin On Protoplasmic Streaming In The Avena Seedling (1942)
- Doctoral advisor: Kenneth V. Thimann
- Author abbrev. (botany): Sweeney

Eleanor Beatrice Marcy "Beazy" Sweeney (August 11, 1914–July 17, 1989) was an American plant physiologist and a pioneering investigator into circadian rhythms. At the time of her death she was professor emerita at the University of California, Santa Barbara, where she had worked since 1961.

Having started her career as a botanist, serendipity led her to dinoflagellate research. She investigated circadian rhythms in photoluminescent dinoflagellates, and other single celled organisms. Later in her career she served as a senior officer in many scientific organizations, including the American Association for the Advancement of Science and the American Institute of Biological Sciences.

== Early life and education ==
Sweeney was born Eleanor Beatrice Marcy on August 11, 1914 in Boston, Massachusetts, the daughter of Eleanor and Henry O. Marcy Jr. She gained her undergraduate degree at Smith College where she performed research into the effect of drugs on cytoplasmic streaming.

She attended graduate school at Radcliffe College, where she investigated how auxin affected cytoplasmic streaming in Avena seedlings under the supervision of Kenneth V. Thimann. She was helped in her research by Folke K. Skoog, who was a postdoctoral fellow at Harvard at the time. She completed her Ph.D. degree in 1942. She married her first husband in 1932 and had four children. In 1961 married secondly the physicist Paul Hartmann Lee.

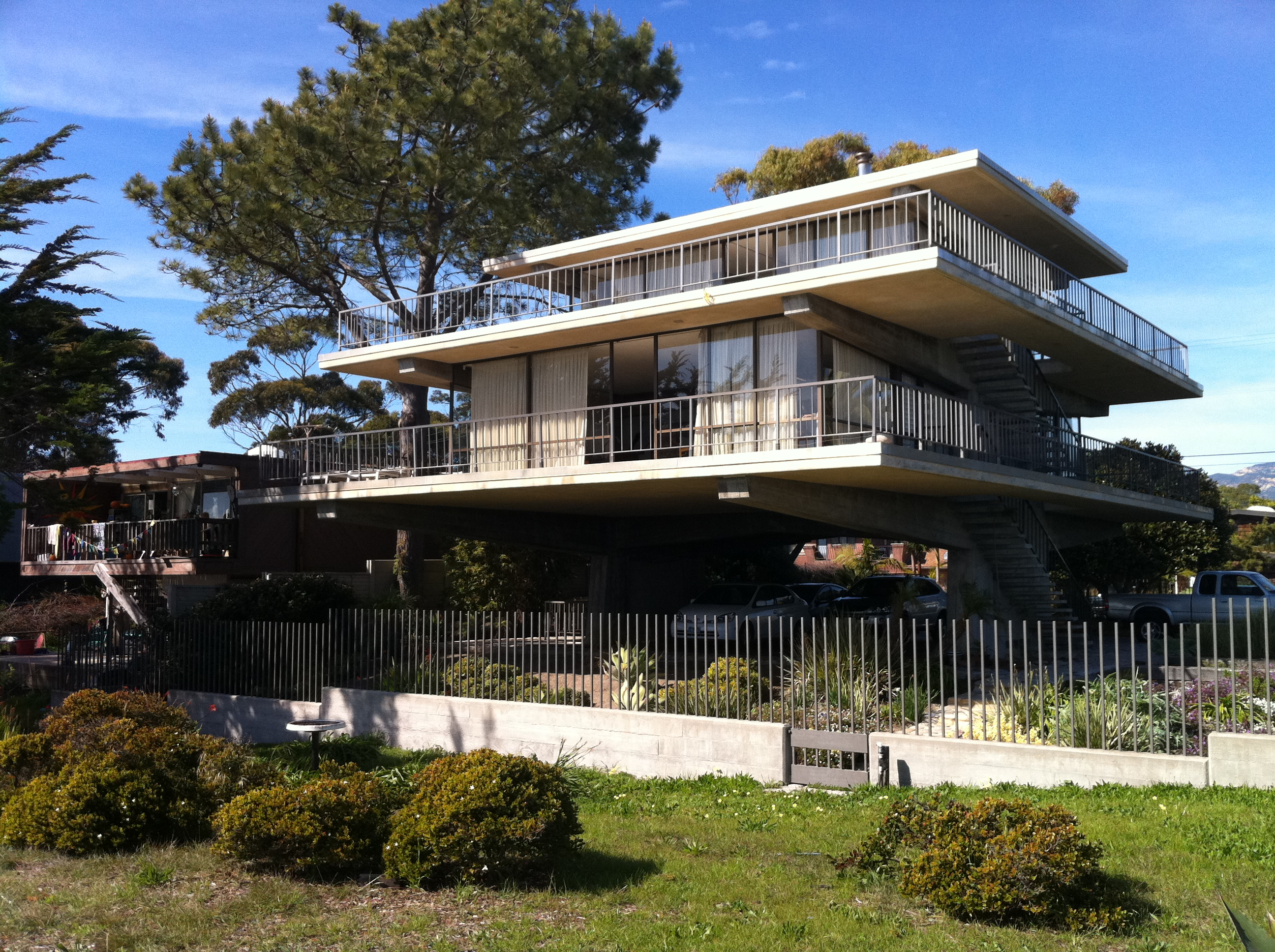
Sweeney and Lee House in Isla Vista near UC Santa Barbara, built in 1968 and designed by the same architect as the Hodgkins and Skubic House next door

== Career ==
Following the completion of her Ph.D., she followed her first husband to Rochester, MD. She was initially unable to find an academic job in botany, so she worked as a lab technician. She then worked as a postdoctoral fellow at the Mayo Clinic. She again followed her husband to San Diego, and she found employment at the Scripps Institution of Oceanography, where she first began working with dinoflagellates, and began her investigations in circadian rhythms. In 1961 she moved to Yale, where she was appointed a lecturer in algal physiology. However, at Yale she was never given a permanent position, so in 1967, she returned to the west coast, with an appointment at the University of California, Santa Barbara, where she was made professor in 1971, and professor emerita in 1982. She served as the associate provost of College of Creative Studies from 1978 to 1981.

While in Santa Barbara, Sweeney gave a tour of the campus to the daughter of a family friend, future Nobel laureate Carol W. Greider, who was a high school student at the time. This led to Greider studying at the College of Creative Studies. Sweeney introduced Greider to research during her freshman year, and mentored her throughout the rest of her time at UCSB.

Sweeney was president of the American Society for Photobiology in 1979, the American Institute of Biological Sciences in 1980, the pacific division of the American Association for the Advancement of Science in 1981, and the Phycological Society of America in 1986.

In 1983, the Botanical Society of America awarded her the Darbaker Prize for Study of Microscopic Algae, with the citation as follows:

Dr. Sweeney is a world-respected innovator in the study of circadian rhythms, particularly in the dinoflagellates. By bringing dinoflagellates into culture and by defining their multiple photoperiodic responses, especially the physiological and ultrastructural aspects of the circadian rhythms of their bioluminescence, she has influenced the research direction of many laboratories.

She received honorary doctorates from Umeå University in 1985, and Knox College in 1986.

She suffered a stroke on 30 June 1989 while traveling to the Gordon Conference on Chronobiology, while visiting the Marine Biological Laboratory at the invitation of her long time collaborator John Woodland Hastings, and fell into a coma. She died on 17 July 1989.

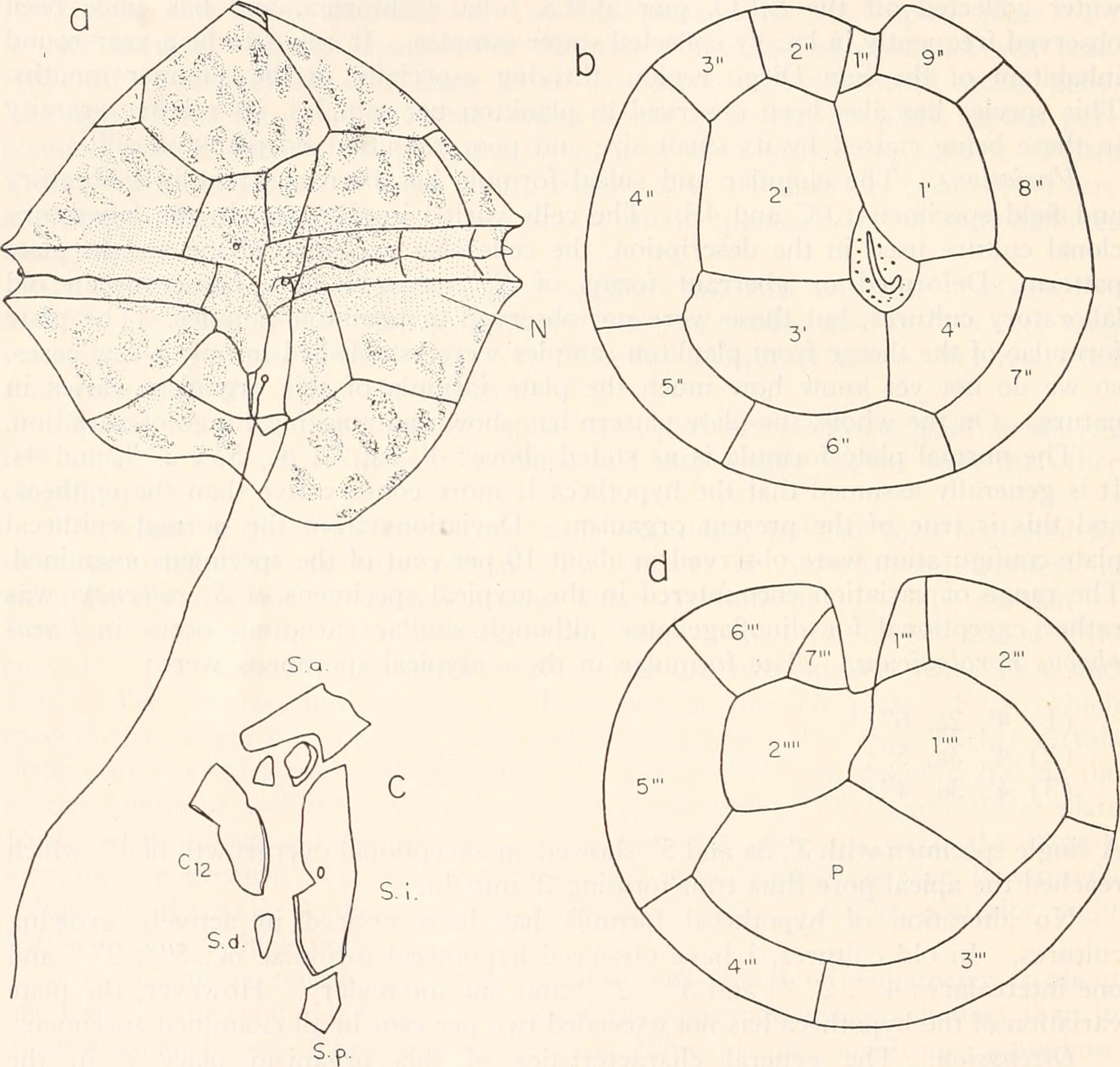
Dinoflagellate algal cell

== Research ==
Upon arrival at the Scripps Institution, Sweeney wanted to study photosynthesis of red and brown algae in different colors of light. However, she encountered delays in procuring the equipment, so on the suggestion of her colleague Marston Sargent, she attempted to culture dinoflagellates. An early success was the discovery that Akashiwo sanguinea (then known as Gymnodinium splendens) requires vitamin B12 in order to grow.

She was also able to culture Lingulodinium polyedra (then known as Gonyaulax polyedra), and became interested in its bioluminescence. She noticed that it luminesced in daily cycles, and presented this result at a conference. At that time, biological rhythms were known for a variety of assemblages of cells but Sweeney noted that when such rhythms shifted, it was impossible to tell if all cells shifted or if the population became unsynchronized. To address this question, she studied single cells in Cartesian divers and found that rhythms occurred in single cells that responded similarly to resetting stimuli. John Woodland Hastings (known as Woody Hastings) heard Sweeney present her work on rhythms at a conference in Asilomar in 1955 and became acquainted with her because he shared her interest in bioluminescent dinoflagellates. They began a collaboration, with Woodland joining her at the Scripps Institution during the summers of 1955 to 1957. Together with Woodland's student Marlene Karakashian, they characterized the circadian rhythm of the species. Later, at Yale, she used electron microscopy to image the internal structure of G. polyedra.

In 1960, she joined an expedition from Cairns to Thursday Island aboard a crocodile hunting boat. She was able to collect a sample of Acetabularia, a green algae with the ability to survive for long periods without its nucleus, enabling her to determine that a nucleus was not required for the maintenance of a circadian rhythm. In 1969 and 1975, she went to sea aboard the NSF's RV Alpha Helix, and studied bioluminescence on voyages to New Guinea and South East Asia. She studied the red tides that killed fish, caused by dinoflagellate algae, and consulted with groups trying to combat these disasters.

She continued her research into circadian rhythms for the rest of her career, publishing her monograph Rhythmic Phenomena in Plants in 1969, and a second edition in 1987.

== Publications ==
Over her career, Sweeney was the author of 139 manuscripts.

=== Selected publications ===
- Sweeney, Beatrice M.; Hastings, J. Woodland (February 1957). "Characteristics of the diurnal rhythm of luminescence in Gonyaulax polyedra". Journal of Cellular and Comparative Physiology. 49 (1): 115–128. doi:10.1002/jcp.1030490107. ISSN 0095-9898.
- Hastings, J. Woodland; Sweeney, Beatrice M. (April 1957). "The luminescent reaction in extracts of the marine dinoflagellate, Gonyaulax polyedra". Journal of Cellular and Comparative Physiology. 49 (2): 209–225. doi:10.1002/jcp.1030490205. ISSN 0095-9898. PMID 13481063.
- Hastings, J. Woodland; Sweeney, Beatrice M. (1957-09-15). "On the Mechanism of Temperature Independence in a Biological Clock". Proceedings of the National Academy of Sciences. 43 (9): 804–811. Bibcode:1957PNAS...43..804W. doi:10.1073/pnas.43.9.804. ISSN 0027-8424. PMC 534330. PMID 16590089.
- Sweeney, Beatrice M.; Hastings, J. Woodland (August 1958). "Rhythmic Cell Division in Populations of Gonyaulax polyedra". The Journal of Protozoology. 5 (3): 217–224. doi:10.1111/j.1550-7408.1958.tb02555.x. ISSN 0022-3921.
- Sweeney, Beatrice M.; Hastings, J. Woodland (1960-01-01). "Effects of Temperature upon Diurnal Rhythms". Cold Spring Harbor Symposia on Quantitative Biology. 25: 87–104. doi:10.1101/SQB.1960.025.01.009. ISSN 0091-7451. PMID 13774256.
- Hastings, J. Woodland; Astrachan, Lazarus; Sweeney, Beatrice M. (1961-09-01). "A Persistent Daily Rhythm in Photosynthesis". The Journal of General Physiology. 45 (1): 69–76. doi:10.1085/jgp.45.1.69. ISSN 0022-1295. PMC 2195161. PMID 13712193.
- Prézelin, Barbara B.; Meeson, Blanche W.; Sweeney, Beatrice M. (1977-09-01). "Characterization of Photosynthetic Rhythms in Marine Dinoflagellates: I. Pigmentation, Photosynthetic Capacity and Respiration". Plant Physiology. 60 (3): 384–387. doi:10.1104/pp.60.3.384. ISSN 0032-0889. PMC 542621. PMID 16660098.
- Prézelin, Barbara B.; Sweeney, Beatrice M. (1977-09-01). "Characterization of Photosynthetic Rhythms in Marine Dinoflagellates: II. Photosynthesis-Irradiance Curves and in Vivo Chlorophyll a Fluorescence". Plant Physiology. 60 (3): 388–392. doi:10.1104/pp.60.3.388. ISSN 0032-0889. PMC 542622. PMID 16660099.
- Harding, L. W.; Meeson, B. W.; Prézelin, B. B.; Sweeney, B. M. (1981). "Diel periodicity of photosynthesis in marine phytoplankton". Marine Biology. 61 (2–3): 95–105. Bibcode:1981MarBi..61...95H. doi:10.1007/bf00386649. ISSN 0025-3162. S2CID 84666246.
- M., Sweeney, Beatrice (1987). Rhythmic phenomena in plants (2nd ed.). San Diego: Academic Press. doi:10.1016/C2013-0-11566-8. ISBN 978-0126790528. OCLC 15280852.
- Sweeney, Beatrice M.; Borgese, M. Beatriz (March 1989). "A Circadian Rhythm in Cell Division in a Prokaryote, the Cyanobacterium Synechococcus WH78031". Journal of Phycology. 25 (1): 183–186. doi:10.1111/j.0022-3646.1989.00183.x. ISSN 0022-3646. S2CID 83576869.
