= Thomas Patrick Coohill =

Photobiologist

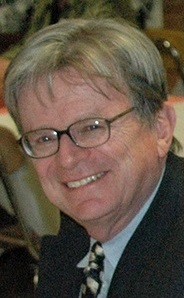
- Born: August 25, 1941 (age 85); Brooklyn, New York
- Education: Pennsylvania State University
- Scientific career
- Fields: Biophysics
- Doctoral advisor: Ernest C. Pollard

Thomas Patrick Coohill (born August 25, 1941) is considered one of the world's experts on the effects of light on living systems (Photobiology).

== Biography ==
Thomas Patrick Coohill, son of Francis Coohill and Mary Donnelly, was born in Brooklyn, New York, on 25 August 1941. He has/had four brothers, Francis, William, Edmund and Kevin, and three sisters, Joan, Margaret and Virginia.All of his grandparents were Irish.

Coohill attended Saint Michael's College at the University of Toronto, where he met his future wife, Patricia Ann Trutty. He received his master's degree at the University of Toledo. His first two sons, Joseph and Thomas Jr., were born in Toledo. He received his PhD in Biophysics at Pennsylvania State University under the tutelage of renowned physicist, Ernest C. Pollard. He then went to work in Pittsburgh, where his third and final son, Matthew, was born.

Coohill has worked in various places: the Medical School at the University of Pittsburgh; the Pittsburgh Veterans Administration Hospital, Woods Hole Marine Biology Lab, Brookhaven National Laboratory, the Jet Propulsion Laboratory, Western Kentucky University and at Siena College. He was President of the American Society for Photobiology in 1989; Sigma Xi speaker from 1990 to 1991. Currently he is a member of the Review Committee of the United Nations for the Montreal Protocol on Substances that Deplete the Ozone Layer. His speciality is the effects of ultraviolet radiation on cells and viruses. He has published over 100 reviewed articles, book chapters, and books. He is a sought after consultant to industry and governments and has been a featured speaker in over 40 countries.

Coohill is the recipient of several awards, including a Sigma Xi National Lectureship (twice), The Order of St. Michael (humanitarian), the meritorious RA Award from the American Society for Photobiology, and Outstanding Teacher and Researcher.

He has published two novels, The Wolves of Pilovo and The 5th World He has been cited widely in the press (e.g. NY Times, San Francisco Chronicle, Der Stern) and interviewed twice on National Public Radio. He has appeared numerous times on TV.

An intrepid traveler, he has visited over 100 countries. As a rite of passage at age 12, he takes each of his grandchildren on a two-week trip, alone.

== Publications ==
- Coohill, Thomas P.; Valenzeno, Dennis P., eds. (2001). Photobiology for the 21st Century. Valdenmar Publishing Company. ISBN 0-9632105-4-8. LCCN 2001090397.
