= Leodis Davis =

American academic and chemist (born 1933)

- Born: September 25, 1933 (age 92); Stamps, Arkansas, U.S.
- Education: Iowa State University
- Scientific career
- Fields: Chemistry
- Workplaces: University of Iowa
- Thesis: I Metal-pyridoxal-amino acid chelates; II Studies on the purification and kinetics of threonine dehydrase (1960)
- Doctoral advisor: David Metzler

Leodis Davis (born September 25, 1933) is an American retired professor of chemistry at the University of Iowa.

== Early life and education ==
Leodis Davis was born on September 25, 1933, in Stamps, Arkansas, the oldest of two sons. He was raised primarily in Kansas City, Missouri, where his parents relocated in search of work. He was interested in science from an early age and cited his high school teachers' influence as inspiring. After graduating from high school, Davis was offered several college scholarships and chose to attend the University of Kansas City (now the University of Missouri at Kansas City), where desegregation had recently made admission available to black students. During his first year at university in 1952, Leodis had a hard time choosing between History and Chemistry as his life’s work. In the end, he found that chemistry would be more suitable for him. He graduated in 1956 with a degree in chemistry and began his graduate studies the same year at Iowa State University. His research focused on vitamin B6 and earned him a Ph.D. under the supervision of David Metzler in 1960. He then spent an additional year as a postdoctoral fellow in Metzler's group before beginning his independent academic career.

== Academic career ==
Leodis Davis' first academic position was at Tennessee State University, where he was recruited to help direct the biochemistry program and was the first faculty member to receive a research grant from the National Institutes of Health. He subsequently moved to Howard University and received tenure there in 1967. After a one-year sabbatical at the University of Iowa in 1968, he decided to remain there as permanent faculty. Davis became the chair of the chemistry department in 1979 and served until 1994. He also served in a number of administrative roles, including as an assistant dean of the College of Liberal Arts and as a provost. Following his retirement, he and his wife endowed a lectureship for the chemistry department and a scholarship for minority students.

== Personal life ==
Leodis Davis' wife June Davis also had a long career at the University of Iowa in various administrative roles, which earned her two awards for distinguished women.
