= Ernest C. Pollard =

British educator

Ernest Pollard
- Born: April 16, 1906; Yunnan, China
- Died: February 24, 1997 (aged 90); Jupiter, Florida, U.S.
- Education: University of Cambridge
- Scientific career
- Workplaces: Duke University; Pennsylvania State University; Yale University; University of Florida
- Doctoral advisor: James Chadwick
- Doctoral students: Thomas Patrick Coohill; Carl Woese

Ernest Charles "Ernie" Pollard (April 16, 1906 – February 24, 1997) was a professor of physics and biophysics and an author, who worked on the development of radar systems in World War II, worked on the physics of living cells, and wrote textbooks and approximately 200 papers on nuclear physics and radiation biophysics.

== Biography ==
The son of Sam Pollard, Ernest C. Pollard lived until age 10 in China, moving to the United Kingdom when his father died. He studied physics at Cambridge University. He did his PhD work under James Chadwick at Cavendish Laboratory, which was led by Ernest Rutherford, receiving his degree in 1932. In 1933, he joined the physics department of Yale University, where he designed the university's first cyclotron in 1939. He co-wrote the first "textbook" in the subject: Applied Nuclear Physics with William L. Davidson, Jr. then Research Physicist of the B.F. Goodrich Company, published in 1942.

From 1941 to 1945 he was a member of the MIT Radiation Laboratory, working on such projects as Li'l Abner (for which he was granted a patent), MEW, the moving target indicator, and the height finder; and serving as associate head, co-head, and head of Division 10. For his work on radar development, he received the President's Certificate of Merit from President of the United States Harry S. Truman.

In 1948 he led the formation of a group of biophysicists at Yale. A department of biophysics was formally organized there in 1954, with funding from the John A. Hartford Foundation, where he became a professor, serving as the departmental chairman until 1961. During this time, Pollard supervised numerous doctoral students including the future Crafoord Prize winner Carl Woese. (The department of biophysics subsequently merged with the department of biochemistry, in 1969, becoming the department of molecular biophysics and biochemistry.)

As part of the centennial celebration at Vassar College, he spoke on The Advance of Physical Science into the Biological and Social Sciences at a conference on the natural and social sciences on 1960-11-04. He was also a member of the national Democratic advisory committee on science and technology during John F. Kennedy's presidential campaign. During the 1950s, he was head of the Committee on Loyalty and Security, an arm of the Federation of American Scientists, a group that actively defended scientists that were attacked during the McCarthy hearings.

Pollard founded the Biophysical Society in 1957, serving as a member of its executive board in that year and also as its president later from 1959–1960.

From 1961 until his retirement in 1971 Pollard taught at Pennsylvania State University, founding the Department of Biophysics there. The Ernest C. Pollard Lectures, given at the university as part of a programme of lectures by the Department of Biochemistry and Molecular Biology, are named after him, as is the Ernest C. Pollard Professorship in Biotechnology. At the same time he served on the NASA Advisory Committee on Space Biology alongside Carl Sagan.

After retirement, he continued as a research scholar, initially at Pennsylvania State University until 1977 and thereafter at the University of Florida and Duke University, as well as the National Institute of Environmental Health Sciences in North Carolina.

== Bibliography ==
- Ernest C. Pollard. Radiation: One Story of the M.I.T. Radiation Laboratory. (a copy can be found in the papers of Kenneth Bainbridge at Harvard University)
- Ernest C. Pollard (1948). Microwaves and radar electronics. J. Wiley. ASIN B0007DQ5DQ.
- Ernest C. Pollard and William L. Davidson Jr, (1942) Applied Nuclear Physics. John Wiley & Sons, Inc. New York
- Ernest C. Pollard (1953). The physics of viruses. Academic Press. ASIN B0007DOTDO. — also published in Scientific American in December 1954
- Ernest C. Pollard; William Lee Davidson (1956). Applied nuclear physics. Wiley. ASIN B0007EY7IA.
- Ernest C. Pollard; Richard B. Setlow (1962). Molecular biophysics. Addison-Wesley.
- Ernest C. Pollard (1982). Radiation : one story of the M.I.T. Radiation Laboratory. Durham, NC: Woodburn Press. ISBN 978-0-9612798-1-3.
- Ernest C. Pollard; Douglas C. Huston (April 1985). Physics, an introduction; poets' physics. Oxford University Press. ISBN 978-0-19-501023-7.
- Ernest C. Pollard (1988). The Cataclysm: Just the Facts. Woodburn Press, State College. ISBN 978-0-9612798-2-0.
- Ernest C. Pollard (December 1, 1991). Radiation: Cells and People. Woodbine. ISBN 978-0-9612798-3-7.
- Ernest C. Pollard; Neena Agarwala; Wallace Snipes (1992). The Molecular Basis of Human Disease and Approaches to Its Treatment. Woodburn Press, Lemont, PA. ISBN 978-0-9612798-5-1.
- Ernest C. Pollard (1993). Sermons in Stones: Thoughts on moral values that are suggested by the scientific revelations of natural law. Lemont, PA: Science and People (The Woodburn Press). ISBN 978-0-9612798-6-8.
