= David E. Metzler =

David Everett Metzler
- Born: August 12, 1924; Palo Alto, California
- Died: September 26, 2013 (aged 89); Ames, Iowa
- Education: University of Wisconsin
- Scientific career
- Fields: Biochemistry
- Workplaces: Iowa State University
- Doctoral advisor: Esmond Snell
- Notable students: Leodis Davis, Pill-Soon Song

David Everett Metzler (1924–2013) was a professor of biochemistry who spent most of his research career at Iowa State University.

== Early life and education ==
Metzler was born on August 12, 1924, in Palo Alto, California, and was raised in Fresno. He attended the California Institute of Technology as an undergraduate, where Linus Pauling was his major professor. He was a pacifist, and a conscientious objector during World War II, and was obligated to pause his studies for public service, which included fighting forest fires and working as an analytical chemist. After completing his studies at Caltech, Metzler began his graduate work at the University of Wisconsin, where he received his Ph.D. in biochemistry in 1952 under the supervision of Esmond Snell. He then spent a year as a postdoctoral fellow at the University of Texas (where Snell had moved).

== Academic career ==
Metzler joined the faculty at Iowa State University in 1953 and would remain there for the rest of his scientific career. He was admitted to the Iowa Academy of Sciences in 1961, spent six months on a National Academy of Sciences-sponsored exchange trip to the Soviet Union in 1965, was awarded a Guggenheim Fellowship in 1970-71, and became a distinguished professor in sciences and humanities at Iowa State in 1986. In 1977 he published the first edition of a major biochemistry textbook, Biochemistry: The Chemical Reactions of Living Cells. The second edition in 2003, co-authored with his wife and longtime coworker Carol Metzler, was reviewed as exceptionally thorough and useful as a reference text.

== Personal life ==
Metzler married Elizabeth Heron in 1948 while he was in graduate school. They had five children, but were divorced in 1977, and he married Carol Harris in 1978, who spent many years working as a researcher and technician in his laboratory. He was a long-time member of the Ames Choral Society. Metzler died on September 26, 2013 at age 89.
