= Shoreline Park, Santa Barbara =

Coordinates: 34.3966°N 119.7070°W

Shoreline Park
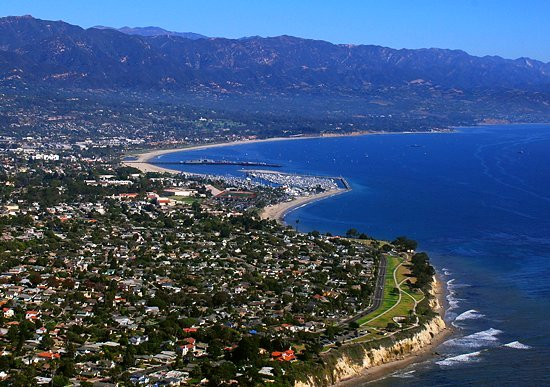
- Aerial view of Shoreline Park in the foreground
- Interactive map of Shoreline Park
- Location: Shoreline Drive in Santa Barbara, California; Extending from La Marina to west of San Rafael Ave.
- Area: 14.6 acres (6 ha)
- Created: 1963-1967
- Designer: Richard B. Taylor
- Operator: City of Santa Barbara Parks & Recreation Department
- Website: Shoreline Park

Shoreline Park, a long, narrow ocean-side strip of land on top of a mesa (i.e. coastal bluff), is located in Santa Barbara, California, United States. Facing the Pacific Ocean, Shoreline Park is one of Santa Barbara's most popular parks.

== Park Facilities ==
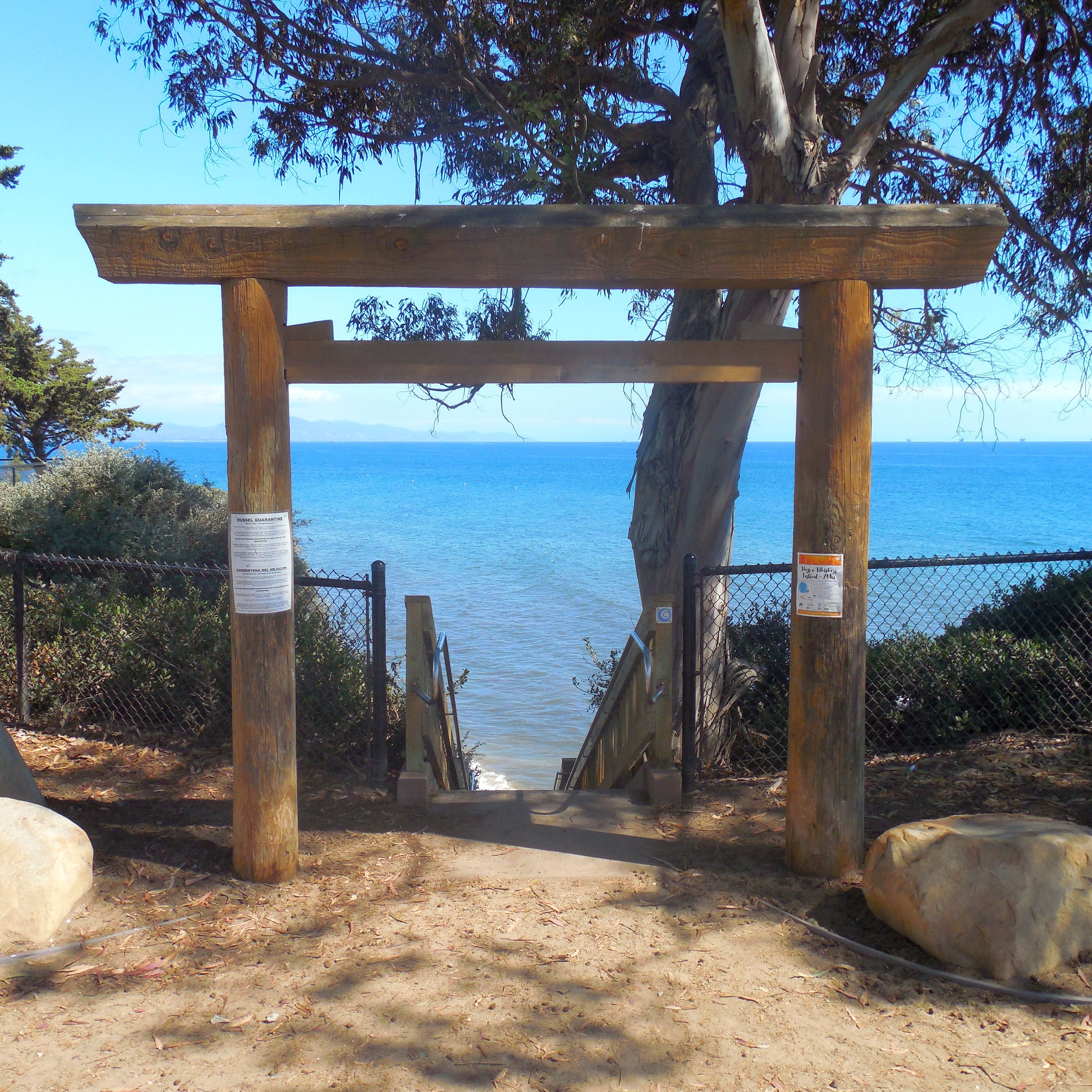
Torii gate leading to the beaches below the park, 2015

The park includes a playground, picnic area, a whale watching area with a telescope situated next to a statue of a large concrete whale tail, as well as a sister city Japanese garden. The park also provides a clear view of the Channel Islands on a good day, and Gray Whale may be observed during their migration months, along with a number of marine mammals including dolphins and seals.

A Torii gateway atop the bluff leads to a wooden staircase descending to the tidal beach about 53 ft (16.15 m) feet below, which is completely submerged during high tide and accessible only during low tide. During the low tide periods, the adjacent Leadbetter Beach and Arroyo Burro Beach (a.k.a. Hendry's Beach) are accessible to the east and west, respectively.

== History ==
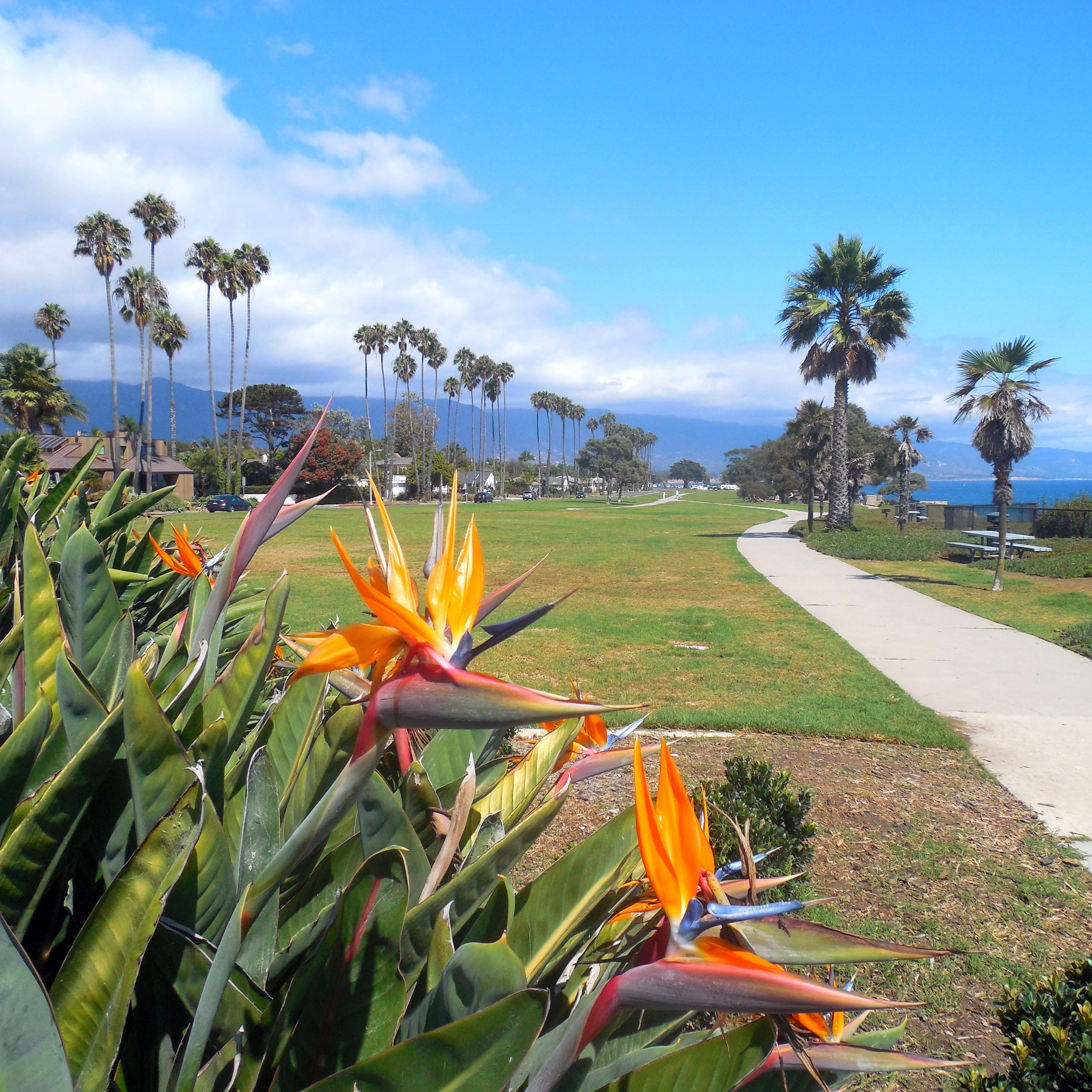
West end of Shoreline Park (looking east), 2015

The area of "the Mesa" where Shoreline Park is located today was utilized as farmland by the Low and Babcock farms until the 1920s. This farmland extended from Cliff Drive (from the north) to the present day Shoreline Park bluffs. When Shoreline Drive and the Marine Terrace subdivisions were constructed during the early 1950s, the present day park land was left undeveloped.

By the early 1960s, a number of attempts had been made to rezone the land to develop residential apartments. In 1963, a group of citizens had urged the City to purchase the land for use as a park, thereby preserving the viewshed and public access. By November of that year, the City Council passed a resolution condemning the land for park and recreational purposes. Subsequently, an ad hoc "Save Our Shoreline Committee" had successfully petitioned voters to approve a bond issue for park acquisition and development. On August 4, 1964, a $1,020,000 ballot proposal was carried out.

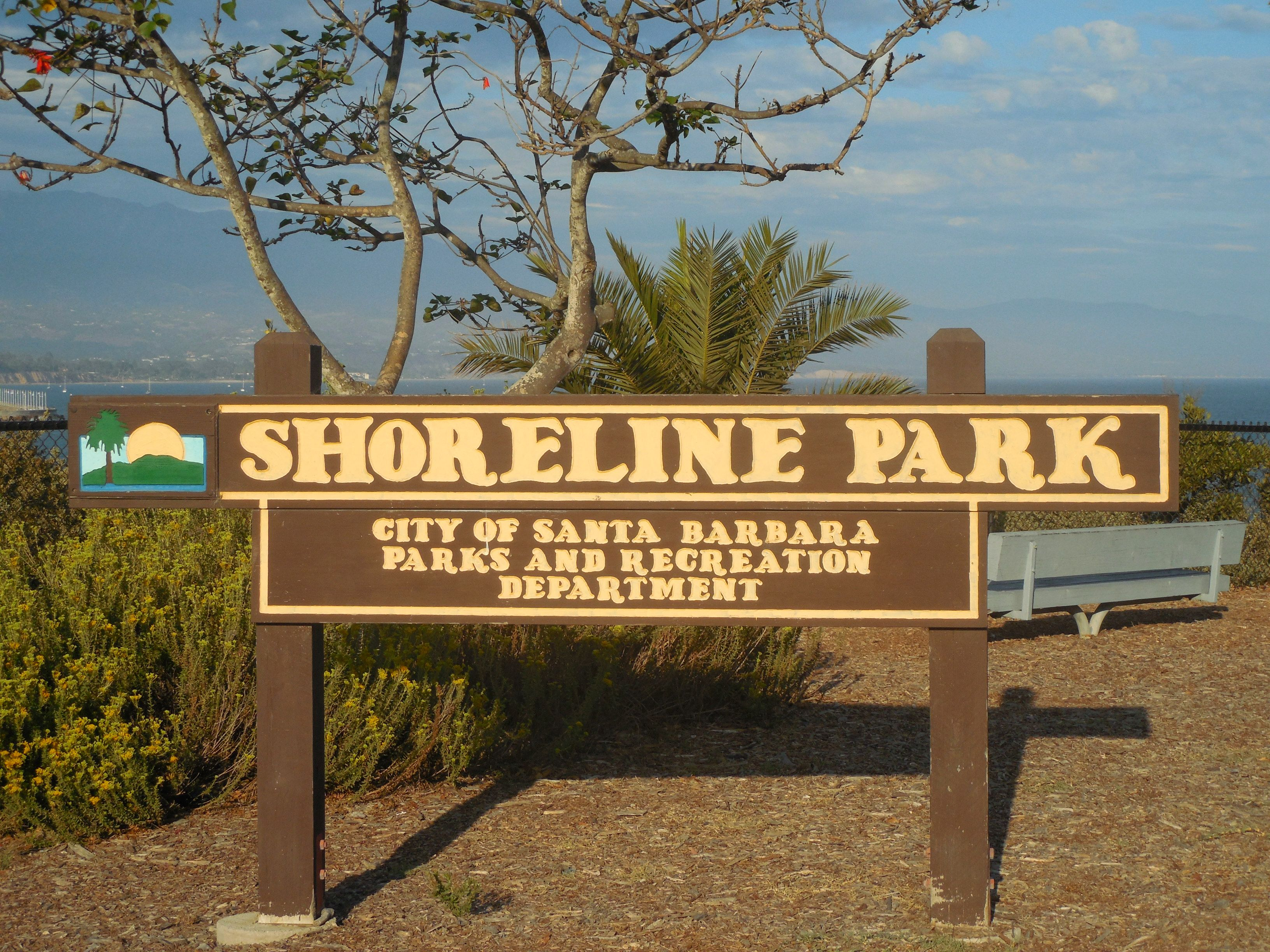
Signage at the east end of Shoreline Park, 2014

In 1966, the City purchased the land from private owners for $852,844.96. By August 1967, the City had received an additional $325,000 from their application for Federal land and Water Conservation funds in order to assist with further acquisition expenses.

Until 1967, the park had been commonly known to the public as “The Shoreline Park”. However, in June of that year, a contest (suggested by "La Mesa Improvement Association") was undertaken to select an official park name. The contest judges chose the new name to be “Shoreline Park”. On August 1, 1967, the City Council concurred with this decision. Over the years hence, a number of unsuccessful attempts have been made to change the name of the park.

Richard B. Taylor (1926-1993), a local landscape architect, was hired to design the park. The park was formally dedicated on December 14, 1968. A plaque in memory of the late Congressman Charles M. Teague was installed at the east end of Shoreline Park on January 28, 1974.

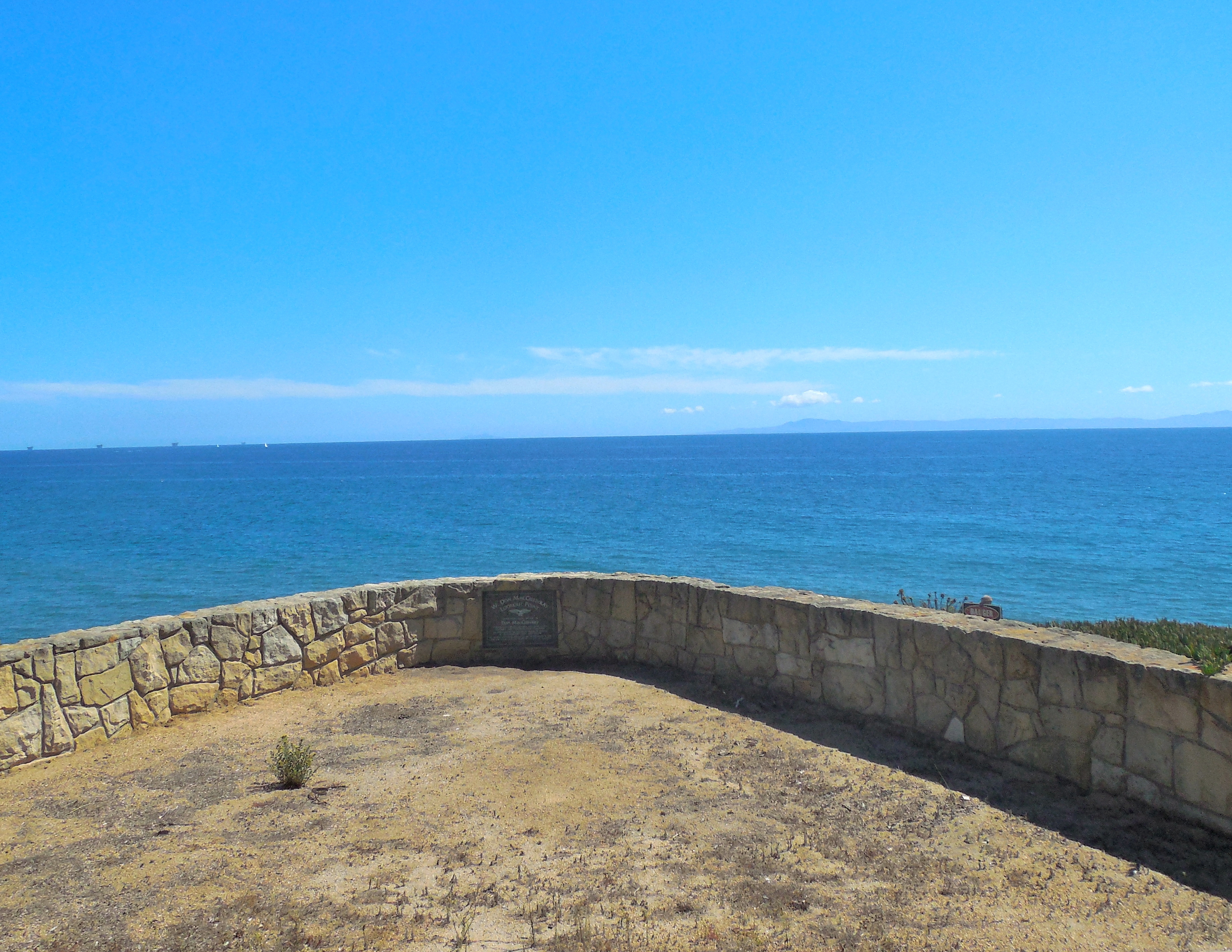
MacGillivray Point lookout, 2015

In 1995, MacGillivray Point, a sandstone lookout structure was constructed along the bluff toward the western end of the park (situated just west of the intersection of Santa Rosa Place and Shoreline Drive). The lookout point was dedicated after former City Councilor, Mayor, and State Legislator Don MacGillivray, who presided as Mayor during the period of the park's development from 1964-68. Since 2008, MacGillivray Point has been fenced off from public access due to safety risks concerning a potentially catastrophic landslide at the location.

By 2011, the City Parks and Recreation Department reported that cracks had occurred in the stone walls, which were likely to correspond with the location of a landslide. Since March of that year, the city surveyor had been monitoring the site and observed minimal movement in 2 out of the 10 total survey points. The city also considered demolishing the structure's stone wall and flagstone pavement, but determined such a project to be too costly and potentially destructive to the bluff.

== Erosion Control Improvements ==
Studies have observed significant coastal erosion occurring along the edge of Shoreline Park since the 1970s, resulting from storm damage and geological activity.

On January 15 through April 2008, and again on June 19–24, 2008, officials closed the stairway leading down to the beach over public safety concerns from a landslide occurring east of the stairway after repeated heavy rains. A portion of the sidewalk from the bluff above had resulted in a collapse, creating a hazard area for pedestrians. The landslide measured at an estimated 120 ft (36.58 m) wide x 60 ft (18.29 m) long, and toed the beach below at an elevation of about 7 ft (2.13 m). The landslide area, as well as MacGillivray Point (located to the west of the landslide) were fenced off until mitigation and more permanent improvements were implemented through the City-approved Shoreline Park Safety Improvement Project (e.g. Shoreline Park Project), all of which were completed by October 2012. The $237,000 project stipulated; Replacing the sidewalk, fencing, and vegetation around the landslide area; Installing permanent safety fencing around MacGillivray Point to prevent public access; Relocating two park benches away from MacGillivray point; And replacing informational signage, corroding light fixtures and their metal halide bulbs with LEDs.

An additional smaller landslide area was found in preliminary stages of development along the eastern side of the 2008 landslide.

== Gallery ==
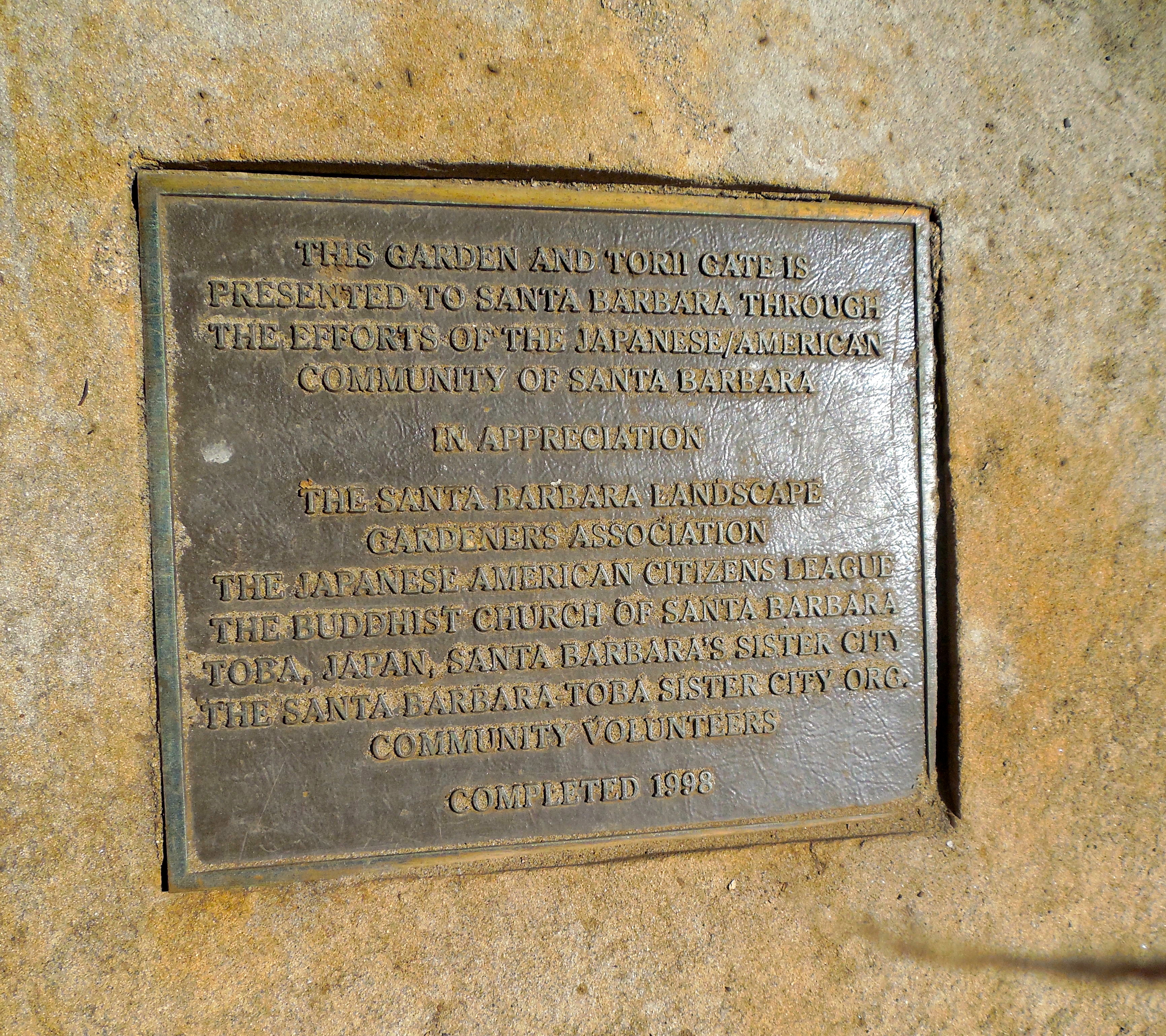
Commemoration plaque for the Torii gate leading to the beaches from the bluffs of Shoreline Park

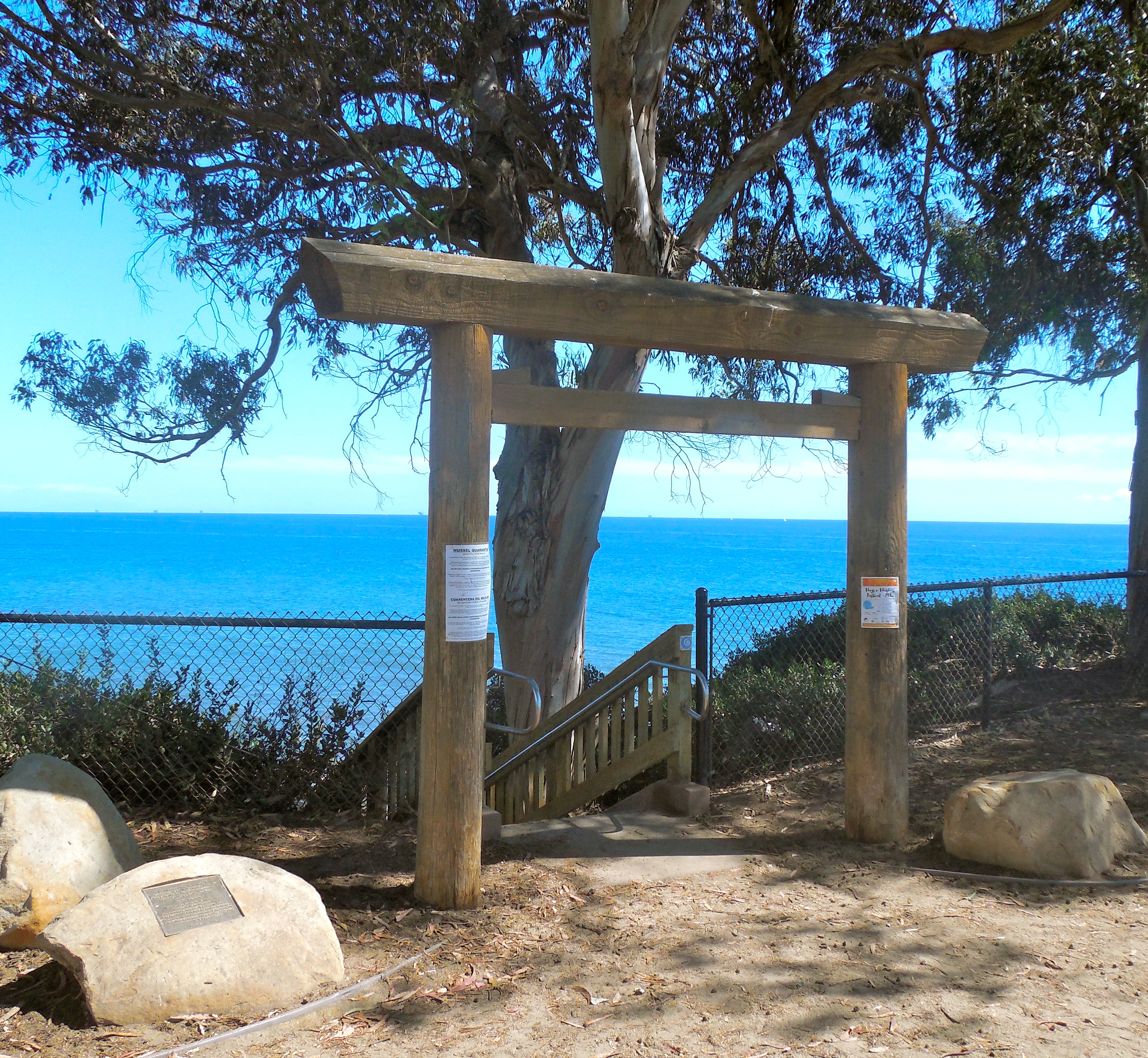
Torii gate along the bluff of Shoreline Park, 2015
