= Hodgkins and Skubic House =

1967 house in Isla Vista, California

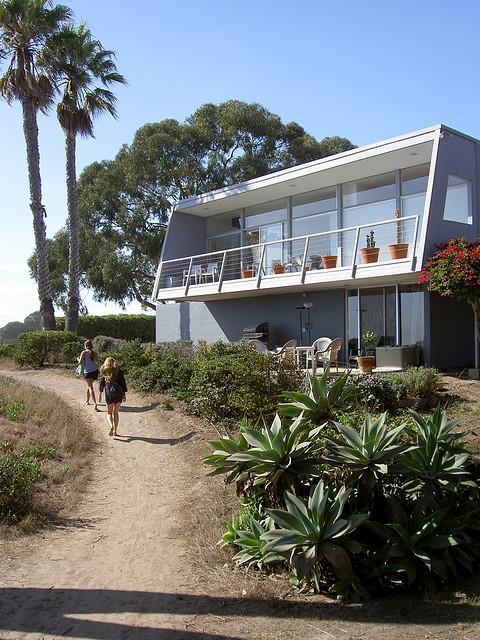
The second Hodgkins and Skubic House

Jean Louise Hodgkins (October 29, 1914 – August 7, 1987) and Vera B. Skubic (January 7, 1921 – July 23, 1998) built two houses in Isla Vista, California on Del Playa Drive that were historic evidence of the mid-20th century International Style presented by architect Richard B. Taylor from South Carolina. A third house next door, also designed by Taylor, is also part of this small collection of International Style houses.

The first house, The Sunset House, built in 1957, was demolished in 2013, while the second house, the Hodgkins and Skubic House, built in 1967, is still standing. The houses, with a third one built next door, were featured in the book Santa Barbara Architecture, from Spanish Colonial to Modern which was published in 1975; of the surviving house, the book says: "A simple and effective statement using common materials of redwood, block, and glass in its construction."

Another book was published in 1977 coauthored by David Gebhard, a professor and architectural historian. The book was a guide to architecture in Los Angeles and Southern California, and in the book, the three houses built in Del Playa by Richard Taylor were described as "the only objects of note" architecturally in the area.

The third house is the Sweeney and Lee House (1968). Beatrice Marcy Sweeney and Paul Hartmann Lee were professors at UCSB in marine biology and physics, and "they helped Marvin Mudrick found the College of Creative Studies at UCSB."

== Hodgkins and Skubic ==
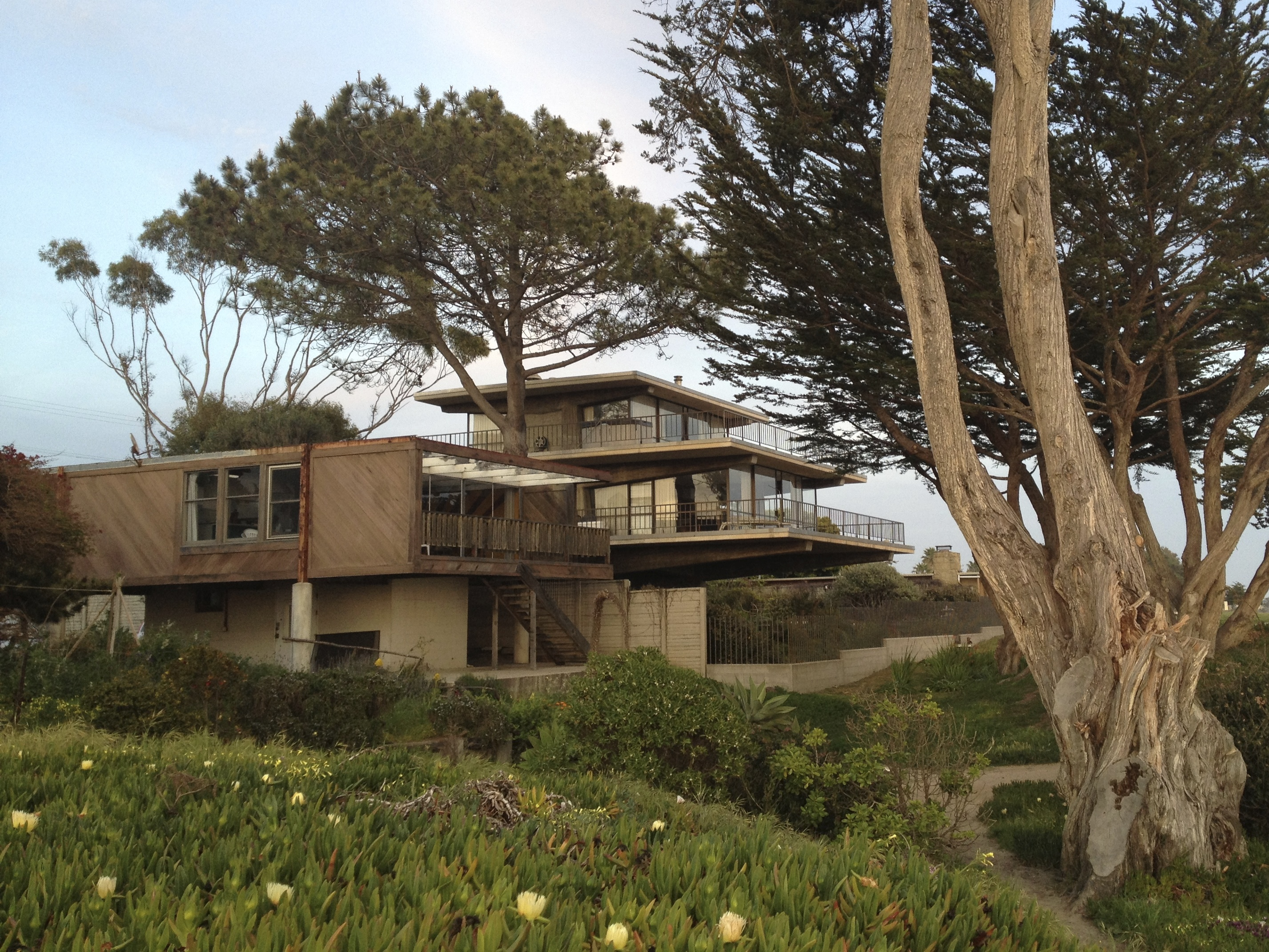
The first Hodgkins and Skubic House (left)

In the 1930s Jean Louise Hodgkins attended University of California, Los Angeles and graduated in 1936 with a Bachelor of Physical Education. She received a Doctorate degree in education from Columbia University. In the late 1930s Hodgkins was teacher of Physical Education at Horace Mann School, Teachers College Schools, and Columbia University. In 1938 she was an instructor at University of California, Los Angeles. During World War II Hodgkins served as a lieutenant commander in the U.S. Navy.

In 1946 Hodgkins became professor of ergonomics and Skubic of physical education, both of them at the University of California, Santa Barbara. In the 1960s they co-wrote articles on health and physical education such as Relative Strenuousness of Selected Sports as Performed by Women, Anticipatory, exercise, and recovery heart rates of girls as affected by four running events and Cardiac Response to Participation in Selected Individual and Dual Sports as Determined by Telemetry. In the 1970s Skubic taught an Ergonomics course for children with hearing disabilities.

According to an article published by the Daily Nexus in 2003, "both played major roles in the development of women’s athletics and ability to participate in recreational activities on American campuses during the 1970s. Prior to their arrival, the words “female” and “athlete” were not mentioned in the same sentence."

== Richard B. Taylor ==
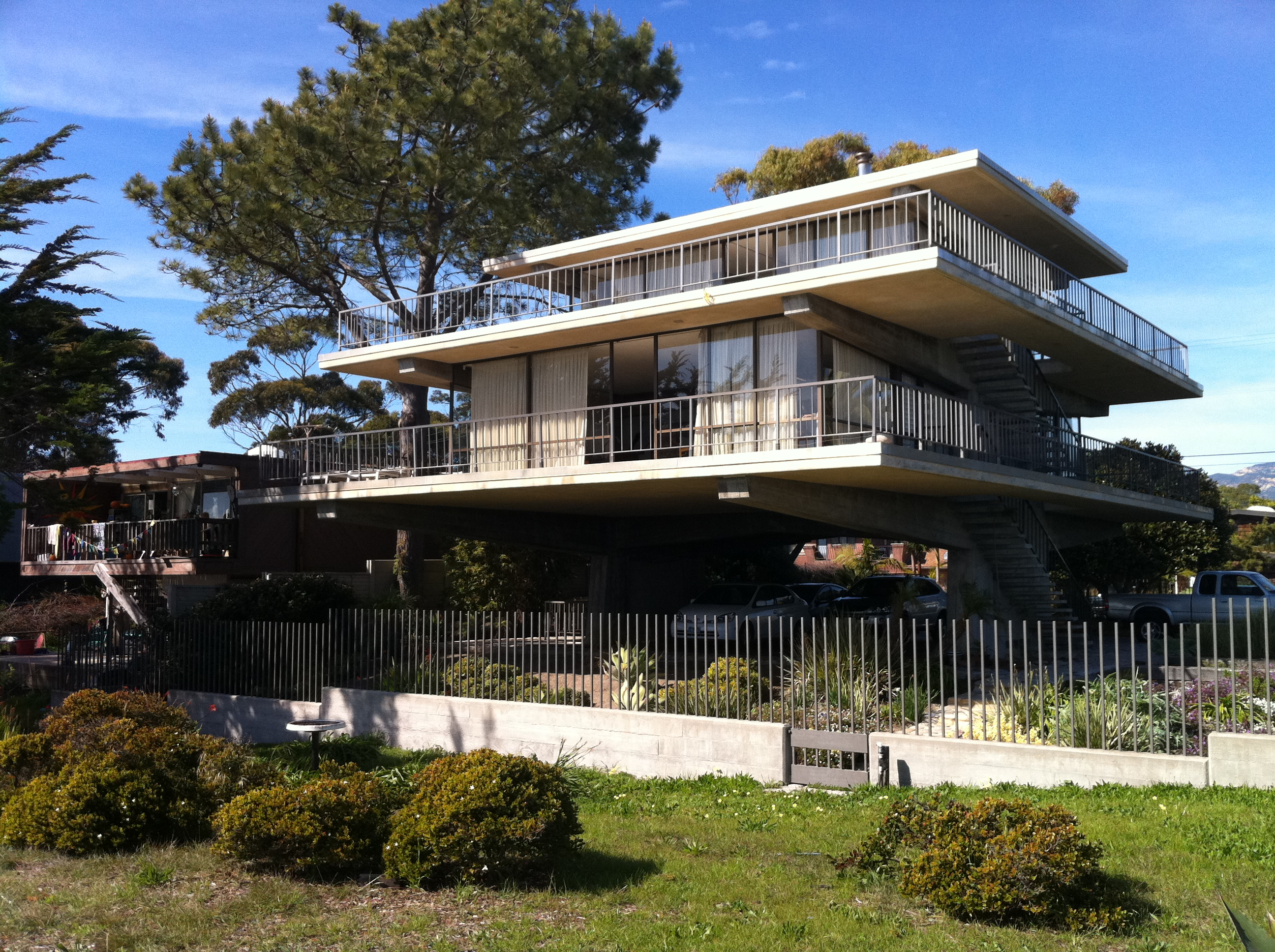
The Sweeney and Lee House

Richard B. Taylor (1926-1993) received a BS and BA in architecture and landscape architecture from the University of Virginia in 1948. He studied at the Fontainebleau Schools in France. He practiced in South Carolina and taught at University of Georgia before moving to the West Coast. He was a lecturer at University of California, Berkeley. In 1956 he moved to Santa Barbara and for the next 36 years he worked in the Tri-County area. Notable projects, other than the three seaside residences in Isla Vista, include: Pershing Park, Shoreline Park, landscape design of Santa Barbara City College, St. Andrew's Presbyterian Church, Parma Elementary School, and the Mission Plaza in San Luis Obispo.

== Legacy ==
At Hodgkin's death in 1987, Skubic established the Jean Hodgkins Memorial Scholarship, now the Jean Hodgkins/Vera Skubic Award, which awards female athletes at University of California, Santa Barbara with "outstanding" achievements.
