= Photomedicine =

Study of light's effect on human health

Photomedicine is an interdisciplinary branch of medicine that involves the study and application of light with respect to health and disease. Photomedicine may be related to the practice of various fields of medicine including dermatology, surgery, interventional radiology, optical diagnostics, cardiology, circadian rhythm sleep disorders and oncology.

A branch of photomedicine is light therapy in which bright light strikes the retinae of the eyes, used to treat circadian rhythm disorders and seasonal affective disorder (SAD). The light can be sunlight or from a light box emitting white or blue (blue/green) light.

== Examples ==
Photomedicine is used as a treatment for many different conditions:

- PUVA for the treatment of psoriasis
- Photodynamic therapy (PDT) for treatment of cancer and macular degeneration - Nontoxic light-sensitive compounds are targeted to malignant or other diseased cells, then exposed selectively to light, whereupon they become toxic and destroy these cells phototoxicity. One dermatological example of PDT is the targeting malignant cells by bonding the light-sensitive compounds to antibodies to these cells; light exposure at particular wavelengths mediates release of free radicals or other photosensitizing agents, destroying the targeted cells.
- Treating circadian rhythm disorders
- Alopecia, pattern hair loss, etc.
- Free electron laser
- Laser hair removal
- IPL
- Photobiomodulation
- Optical diagnostics, for example optical coherence tomography of coronary plaques using infrared light
- Confocal microscopy and fluorescence microscopy of in vivo tissue
- Diffuse reflectance infrared fourier transform for in vivo quantification of pigments (normal and cancerous), and hemoglobin
- Perpendicular-polarized flash photography and fluorescence photography of the skin

== See also ==
- Blood irradiation therapy
- Aesthetic medicine
- Laser hair removal
- Laser medicine
- Light therapy
- Neuromodulation
- Neurostimulation
- Neurotechnology
- Rox Anderson
