= American Society for Photobiology =

The American Society for Photobiology (ASP) is a scientific society for the promotion of research in photobiology, integration of different photobiology disciplines, dissemination of photobiology knowledge, and provides information on photobiological aspects of national and international issues.

== History ==
The society was formed in 1972 and held its inaugural meeting on Sunday June 10, 1973, in Sarasota, Florida, under the presidency of founder Kendric C. Smith.

== Activities ==
=== Publications ===
The society publishes Photochemistry and Photobiology as its official journal. Other publications include the free online textbook, Photobiological Sciences Online.

=== Meetings ===
The society met annually from its formation until 2004 and has met biennially since then.

=== Awards ===
The society awards a number of prizes at its meetings including the ASP Research Award, the ASP New Investigator Award, the ASP Photon Award and the ASP Lifetime Achievement Award. Recipients of the Lifetime Achievement Award include John Woodland Hastings, Pill-Soon Song, and Margaret Kripke.
