= Photobiology =

Scientific study of light's effect on living organisms

Photobiology is the scientific study of the beneficial and harmful interactions of light (technically, non-ionizing radiation) in living organisms. The field includes the study of photophysics, photochemistry, photosynthesis, photomorphogenesis, visual processing, circadian rhythms, photomovement, bioluminescence, and ultraviolet radiation effects.

The division between ionizing radiation and non-ionizing radiation is typically considered to be a photon energy greater than 10 eV, which approximately corresponds to both the first ionization energy of oxygen, and the ionization energy of hydrogen at about 14 eV.

When photons come into contact with molecules, these molecules can absorb the energy in photons and become excited. Then they can react with molecules around them and stimulate "photochemical" and "photophysical" changes of molecular structures.

== Photophysics ==
This area of Photobiology focuses on the physical interactions of light and matter. When molecules absorb photons that matches their energy requirements they promote a valence electron from a ground state to an excited state and they become a lot more reactive. This is an extremely fast process, but very important for different processes.

== Photochemistry ==
This area of Photobiology studies the reactivity of a molecule when it absorbs energy that comes from light. It also studies what happens with this energy, it could be given off as heat or fluorescence so the molecule goes back to ground state.

There are 3 basic laws of photochemistry:

1. First Law of Photochemistry: This law explains that in order for photochemistry to happen, light has to be absorbed.
2. Second Law of Photochemistry: This law explains that only one molecule will be activated by each photon that is absorbed.
3. Bunsen-Roscoe Law of Reciprocity: This law explains that the energy in the final products of a photochemical reaction will be directly proportional to the total energy that was initially absorbed by the system.

== Plant photobiology ==
Plant growth and development is highly dependent on light. Photosynthesis is one of the most important biochemical processes for life on earth and its possible only due to the ability of plants to use energy from photons and convert it into molecules such as NADPH and ATP, to then fix carbon dioxide and make it into sugars that plants can use for their growth and development. But photosynthesis is not the only plant process driven by light, other processes such as photomorphology and plant photoperiod are extremely important for regulation of vegetative and reproductive growth as well as production of plant secondary metabolites.

=== Photosynthesis ===
Photosynthesis is defined as a series of biochemical reactions that phototrophic cells perform to transform light energy to chemical energy and store it in carbon-carbon bonds of carbohydrates. As it is widely known, this process happens inside of the chloroplast of photosynthetic plant cells where light absorbing pigments can be found embedded in the membranes of structures called thylakoids. There are 2 main pigments present in the Photosystems of higher plants: chlorophyll (a or b) and carotenes. These pigments are organized to maximize the light reception and transfer, and they absorb specific wavelengths to broaden the amount of light that can be captured and used for photo-redox reactions.

==== Photosynthetically Active Radiation (PAR) ====
Due to the limited amount of pigments in plant photosynthetic cells, there is a limited range of wavelengths that plants can use to perform photosynthesis. This range is called "Photosynthetically Active Radiation (PAR)". This range is almost the same as the human visible spectrum and it extends in wavelengths from approximately 400-700 nm. PAR is measured in μmol s^{−1}m^{−2} and it measures the rate and intensity of radiant light in terms of micro-moles per unit of surface area and time that plants can use for photosynthesis.

==== Photobiologically Active Radiation (PBAR) ====
Photobiologically Active Radiation (PBAR) is a range of light energy beyond and including PAR. Photobiological Photon Flux (PBF) is the metric used to measure PBAR.

=== Photomorphogenesis ===
This process refers to the development of the morphology of plants which is light-mediated and controlled by 5 distinct photoreceptors: UVR8, Cryptochrome, Phototropin, Phytochrome r and Phytochrome fr. Light can control morphogenic processes such as leaf size and shoot elongation.

Different wavelengths of light produce different changes in plants. Red to Far Red light for example, regulates stem growth and straightening of the seedling shoots that are coming out of the ground. Some studies also claim that red and far red light increases the rooting mass of tomatoes as well as the rooting percentage of grape plants. On the other hand, blue and UV light regulate the germination and elongation of the plant as well as other physiological processes such as stomatal control and responses to environmental stress. Finally, green light was thought not to be available to plants due to the lack of pigments that would absorb this light. However, in 2004 it was found that green light can influence stomatal activity, stem elongation of young plants and leaf expansion.

=== Secondary Plant Metabolites ===
These compounds are chemicals that plants produce as part of their biochemical processes and help them perform certain functions as well as protect themselves from different environmental factors. In this case, some metabolites such as anthocyanins, flavonoids, and carotenes, can accumulate in plant tissues to protect them from UV radiation and very high light intensity

== Photobiologists ==
- Thomas Patrick Coohill, former president of the American Society for Photobiology
- Harold F. Blum, who explored sunlight-induced skin cancer
- Paul Bert, 1878 photobiology pioneer

== See also ==
- Ecological light pollution
- Light effects on circadian rhythm
- Light therapy
- Photobiomodulation
- Photochemical and Photobiological Sciences
- Photoperiodism
- Scotobiology
