= Photochemical and Photobiological Sciences =

Photochemical & Photobiological Sciences
- Discipline: Photochemistry, photobiology
- Language: English
- Edited by: Dario Bassani, Rex Tyrrell

Publication details
- History: 2002–present
- Publisher: Springer Science+Business Media on behalf of the European Photochemistry Association and the European Society for Photobiology
- Frequency: Monthly
- Open access: Hybrid
- Impact factor: 4.328 (2021)

Standard abbreviations
- ISO 4: Photochem. Photobiol. Sci.

Indexing
- CODEN: PPSHCB
- ISSN: 1474-905X (print); 1474-9092 (web)
- LCCN: 2002257028
- OCLC no.: 49233320

Links
- Journal homepage; Online archive

Photochemical & Photobiological Sciences is a monthly peer-reviewed scientific journal covering all areas of photochemistry and photobiology. It was established in 2002 and is published by Springer Science+Business Media on behalf of the European Photochemistry Association and the European Society for Photobiology. The editors-in-chief are Dario Bassani (University of Bordeaux) and Rex Tyrrell (University of Bath).

== Abstracting and indexing ==
The journal is abstracted and indexed in:

- Biological Abstracts
- BIOSIS Previews
- Chemical Abstracts Service
- Current Contents/Physical, Chemical & Earth Sciences
- EBSCO databases
- Ei Compendex
- Index Medicus/MEDLINE/PubMed
- ProQuest databases
- Science Citation Index Expanded
- Scopus

According to the Journal Citation Reports, the journal has a 2021 impact factor of 4.328.

== See also ==
- Chemical biology
