= National Register of Historic Places listings in Jefferson County, Iowa =

Location of Jefferson County in Iowa

This is a list of the National Register of Historic Places listings in Jefferson County, Iowa.

This is intended to be a complete list of the properties and districts on the National Register of Historic Places in Jefferson County, Iowa, United States. Latitude and longitude coordinates are provided for many National Register properties and districts; these locations may be seen together in a map.

There are 29 properties and districts listed on the National Register in the county.

This National Park Service list is complete through NPS recent listings posted March 21, 2025.

== Current listings ==
	Name on the Register	Image	Date listed	Location	City or town	Description
1	Architecture of Henry K. Holsman Historic Campus District	Architecture of Henry K. Holsman Historic Campus District	October 31, 1983 (#83003605)	Bounded by Merrill St., Iowa Highway 1, and Carter Memorial Dr. 41°00′58″N 91°58′00″W	Fairfield	
2	W.C. Ball House	W.C. Ball House	April 4, 1985 (#85000691)	Rural Route #2; 41°01′11″N 91°57′32″W	Fairfield	
3	James A. Beck House	James A. Beck House	March 29, 1978 (#78001225)	401 E. Burlington Ave. 41°00′30″N 91°57′47″W	Fairfield	Designed by architect George Franklin Barber
4	Burnett-Montgomery House	Burnett-Montgomery House	January 27, 1983 (#83000372)	605 N. 3rd St. 41°00′52″N 91°57′55″W	Fairfield	
5	James F. Clarke House	James F. Clarke House	February 8, 1980 (#80001453)	500 S. Main St. 41°00′21″N 91°58′00″W	Fairfield	
6	Evergreen Ridge Stock Farm Historic District		June 21, 2007 (#07000559)	2224 IA S 40°59′04″N 91°57′55″W	Fairfield	
7	Fairfield Public Library	Fairfield Public Library	May 23, 1983 (#83000373)	Court and Washington; 41°00′29″N 91°54′43″W	Fairfield	
8	Former US Post Office Building	Former US Post Office Building	January 24, 1991 (#90002128)	110 S. Court St. 41°00′27″N 91°57′43″W	Fairfield	
9	O.F. and Lulu E. Fryer House	O.F. and Lulu E. Fryer House	February 5, 1999 (#99000131)	902 S. Main St. 40°59′32″N 91°57′18″W	Fairfield	
10	Fred and Rosa Fulton Barn	Fred and Rosa Fulton Barn	February 22, 1999 (#99000119)	1210 278th Boulevard; 40°54′04″N 92°08′18″W	Selma	
11	Gobble and Heer-Spurgeons Building	Gobble and Heer-Spurgeons Building	October 13, 2015 (#15000727)	51 E. Broadway; 41°00′28″N 91°57′47″W	Fairfield	
12	Henn Mansion	Henn Mansion	January 11, 1983 (#83000374)	Maharishi University of Management campus 41°01′00″N 91°57′59″W	Fairfield	
13	Iowa Malleable Iron Company	Iowa Malleable Iron Company	February 22, 1999 (#99000122)	600-608 N. 9th St. 41°00′47″N 91°58′33″W	Fairfield	
14	Jefferson County Courthouse	Jefferson County Courthouse	July 2, 1981 (#81000250)	Court St. between Briggs and Hempstead Aves. 41°00′37″N 91°57′55″W	Fairfield	
15	Louden Machinery Company	Louden Machinery Company	February 22, 1999 (#99000128)	607 W. Broadway Ave. 41°00′32″N 91°58′15″W	Fairfield	
16	Louden Monorail System in the Auto Repair Shop	Louden Monorail System in the Auto Repair Shop	February 22, 1999 (#99000129)	117 E. Broadway Ave. 41°00′27″N 91°57′43″W	Fairfield	
17	Louden Whirl-Around	Louden Whirl-Around	February 22, 1999 (#99000123)	905 E. Harrison Ave. 40°59′54″N 91°57′06″W	Fairfield	
18	R. B. and Lizzie L. Louden House	R. B. and Lizzie L. Louden House	February 22, 1999 (#99000125)	107 W. Washington Ave. 41°00′21″N 91°57′53″W	Fairfield	
19	R. Bruce and May W. Louden House	R. Bruce and May W. Louden House	September 12, 2003 (#99000124)	501 W. Adams Ave. 41°00′18″N 91°58′09″W	Fairfield	
20	R.R. and Antoinette Louden House	R.R. and Antoinette Louden House	February 22, 1999 (#99000130)	905 E. Adams Ave. 41°00′17″N 91°57′05″W	Fairfield	
21	William and Mary Jane Louden House	William and Mary Jane Louden House	February 18, 1999 (#99000118)	501 W. Washington Ave. 41°00′22″N 91°58′09″W	Fairfield	
22	August and Vera Luedtke Barn		February 22, 1999 (#99000121)	1938 185th St. 41°02′17″N 91°59′57″W	Fairfield	
23	McElhinny House	McElhinny House	December 19, 1977 (#77000524)	300 N. Court St. 41°00′43″N 92°02′25″W	Fairfield	
24	New Sweden Chapel	New Sweden Chapel	March 25, 1977 (#77000525)	East of Fairfield off U.S. Route 34; 41°01′22″N 91°46′47″W	Fairfield	
25	Old Settlers' Association Park and Rhodham Bonnifield House	Old Settlers' Association Park and Rhodham Bonnifield House	August 14, 1986 (#86001601)	B St. 41°01′08″N 91°57′24″W	Fairfield	
26	George A. Wells House	George A. Wells House	January 27, 1983 (#83000375)	304 S. Main St. 41°00′15″N 91°57′50″W	Fairfield	
27	Wells-Stubbs House	Wells-Stubbs House	October 10, 1985 (#85003000)	508 E. Burlington Ave. 41°00′56″N 91°57′22″W	Fairfield	
28	Wilson Building	Wilson Building	January 24, 1991 (#90002129)	106-108 S. Court St. 41°00′28″N 91°57′40″W	Fairfield	
29	US Senator James F. Wilson House	US Senator James F. Wilson House	January 24, 1991 (#90002130)	805 S. Main St. 40°59′44″N 91°57′45″W	Fairfield	

== See also ==
- List of National Historic Landmarks in Iowa
- National Register of Historic Places listings in Iowa
- Listings in neighboring counties: Henry, Keokuk, Van Buren, Wapello, Washington
