= Former United States Post Office =

Former United States Post Office may refer to:

Alphabetical by state, then town

- Former United States Post Office Building (Fairfield, Iowa), listed on the U.S. National Register of Historic Places (NRHP)
- Former United States Post Office (Belmont, North Carolina), now Belmont City Hall, NRHP-listed
- Former United States Post Office (Smithfield, North Carolina), NRHP-listed
- Former United States Post Office (Kaukauna, Wisconsin), NRHP-listed
