= Roundabout PlayPump =

Water pump system operated by children playing

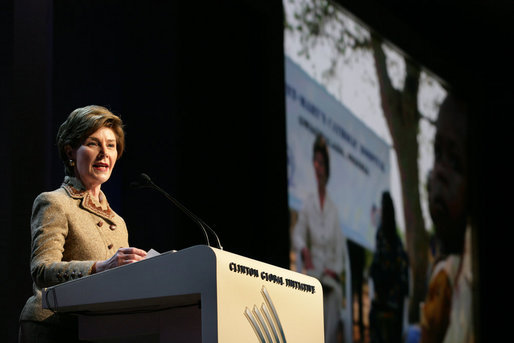
Laura Bush announcing partnership with Case Foundation to support the provision and installations of PlayPump water systems

The Roundabout PlayPump is a system that uses the energy created by children playing to operate a water pump. It is manufactured by the South African company Roundabout Outdoor. It operates in a similar way to a windmill-driven water pump.

The PlayPump received heavy publicity and funding when first introduced, but has since been criticized for being too expensive, too complex to maintain or repair in low-resource settings, too reliant on child labor, and overall less effective than traditional handpumps. WaterAid, one of the biggest water charities in the world, opposes the PlayPump for these reasons.

== Design ==
The PlayPump water system is a playground merry-go-round attached to a water pump. The spinning motion pumps underground water into a 2,500-liter tank raised seven meters above ground. The water in the tank is easily dispensed by a tap valve. According to the manufacturer the pump can raise up to 1400 liters of water per hour from a depth of 40 meters. Excess water is diverted below ground again.

The storage tank has a four-sided advertising panel. Two sides are used to advertise products, thereby providing money for maintenance of the pump, and the other two sides are devoted to public health messages about topics like HIV/AIDS prevention.

== History ==
The PlayPump was invented in South Africa by Ronnie Stuiver, a borehole driller and engineer, who exhibited it at an agricultural fair in 1989. Trevor Field, an agricultural executive, saw the device at the fair and licensed it from Stuiver. Field installed the first two systems in KwaZulu-Natal province in South Africa in 1994, and began receiving media attention in 1999, when Nelson Mandela attended the opening of a school which had a PlayPump. In 2000, PlayPump received the World Bank Development Marketplace Award, and it became internationally prominent following a 2005 PBS Frontline report in 2005. At a 2006 Clinton Global Initiative ceremony, donors pledged $16.4 million to install more PlayPumps.

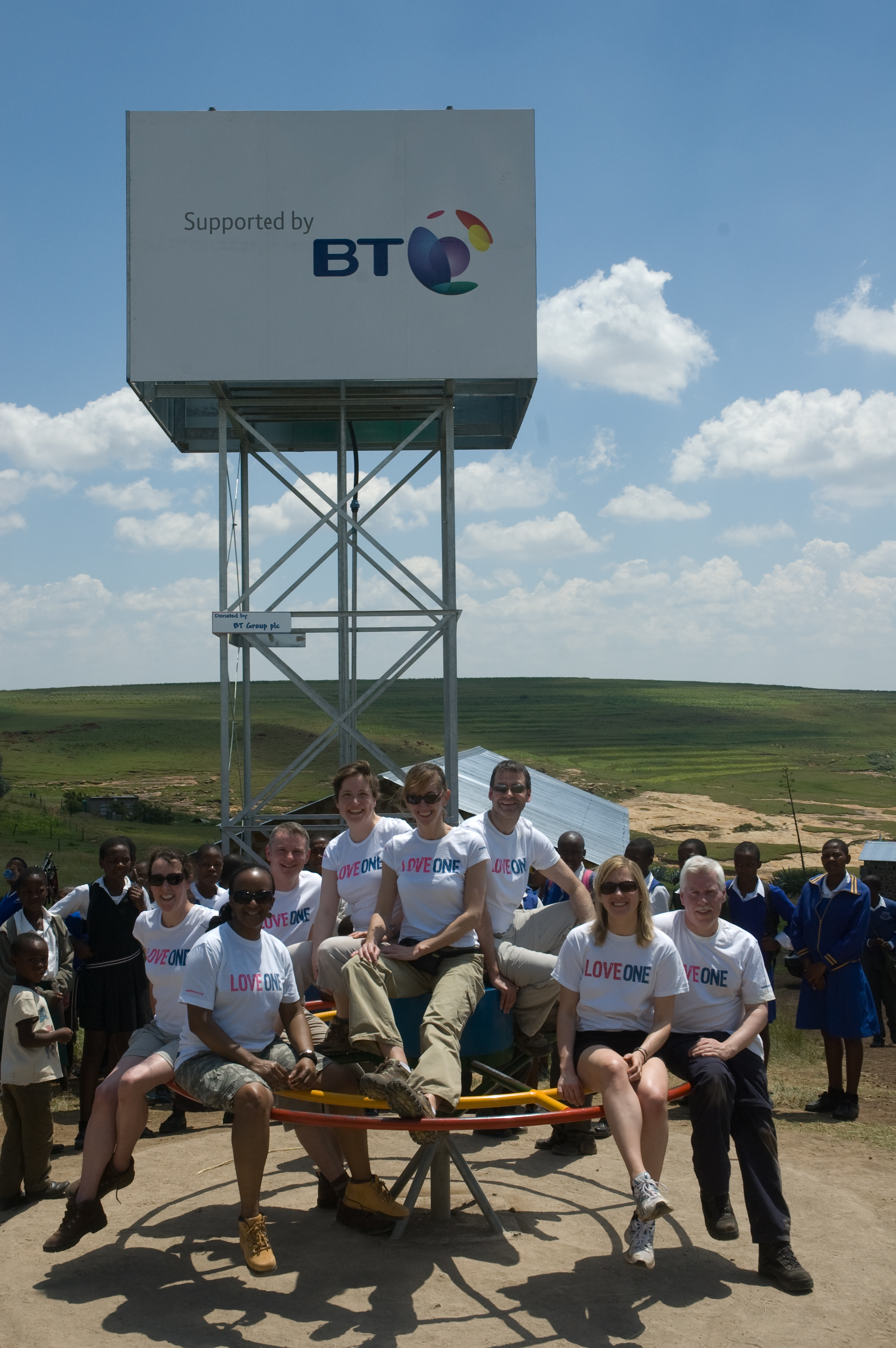
Volunteers from British Telecom site atop a Roundabout PlayPump in Lesotho

By 2008, 1,000 PlayPumps had been installed, and Field set a goal of installing 4,000 by 2010. However, in 2009 PlayPumps International turned its inventory of uninstalled PlayPumps over to Water For People, and stopped installing new PlayPumps in order to focus on maintenance of existing ones.

== Ineffectiveness ==
The Guardian calculated in 2009 that children would have to "play" for 27 hours every day to meet PlayPumps' stated targets of providing 2,500 people per pump with their daily water needs.

In June 2010, PBS's Frontline/World aired an update about the failure of PlayPumps, particularly in Mozambique. Many older women, who were not consulted prior to the installation of the PlayPumps, found operating them to be difficult, especially when there were few children around. PlayPumps were also breaking down, with no way for villagers to make the expensive necessary repairs. A comprehensive report about these failures was released by UNICEF in 2007.

This is an example of ineffective altruism in the book Doing Good Better by effective altruist philosopher William MacAskill.

== See also ==
- Empower Playgrounds
- Blood: Water Mission
- Water privatisation in South Africa
- Water scarcity in Africa
