= Roundabout (play) =

Piece of playground equipment

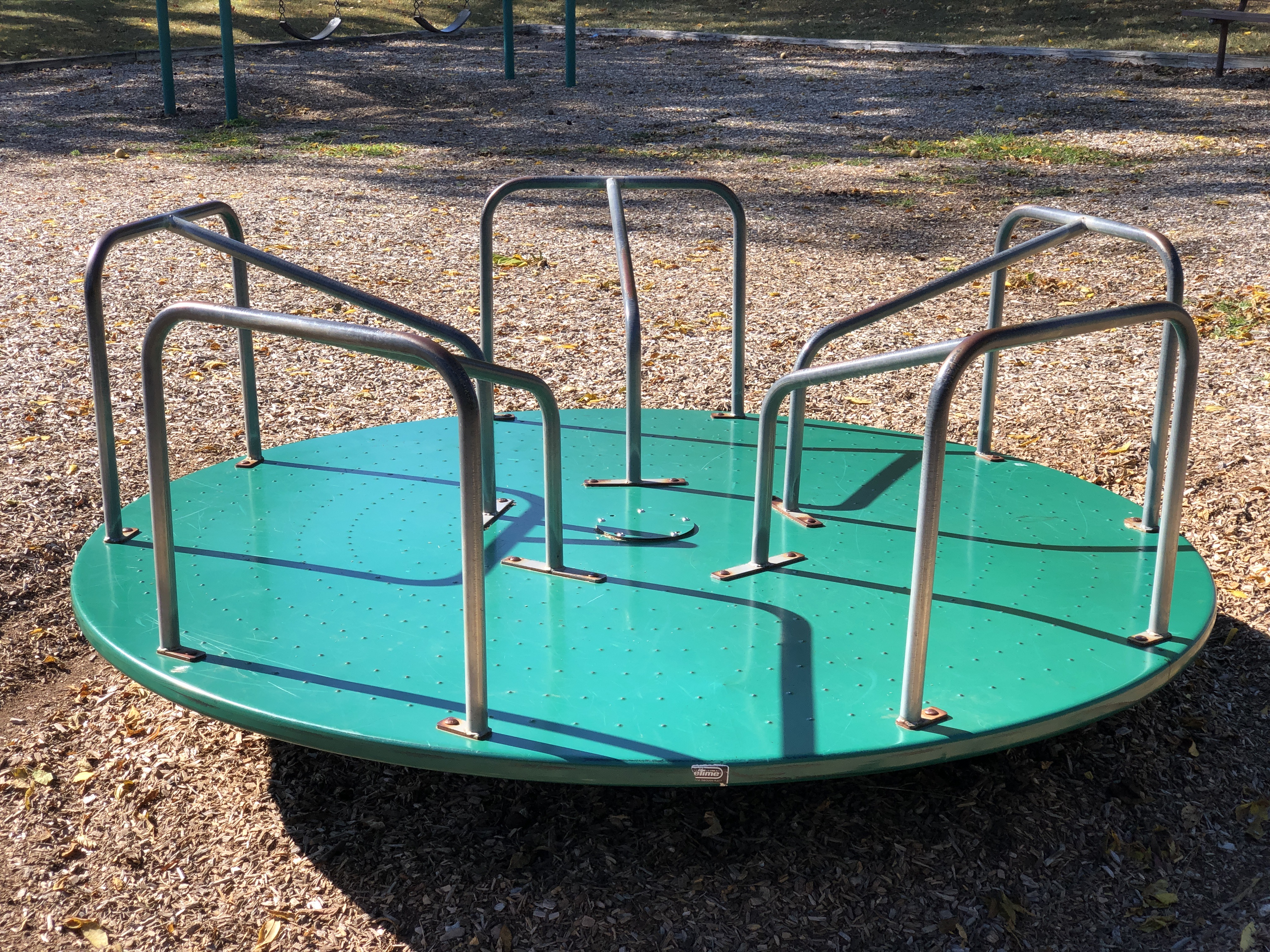
A merry-go-round at a park in New Jersey.

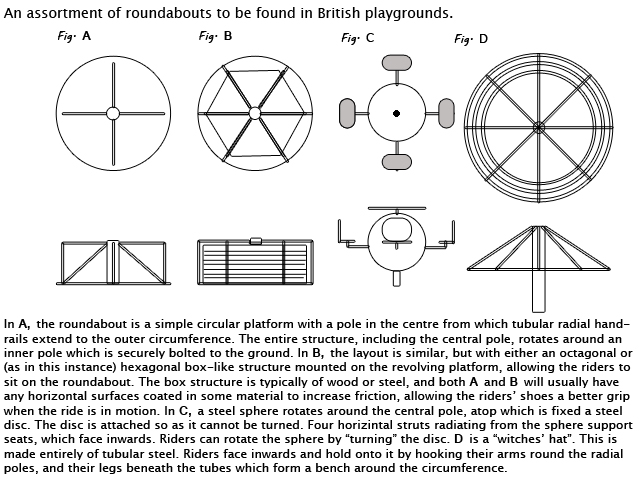
A simplified drawing of various older types of roundabout to be found in British playgrounds

A roundabout (British English), merry-go-round (American English), or carousel (Australian English), is a piece of playground equipment, a flat disc, frequently about 2 to 3 metres (6 ft 7 in to 9 ft 10 in) in diameter, with bars on it that act as both hand-holds and something to lean against while riding. The disk can be made to spin by pushing or pulling on its handles, either by running around the outside, or by pulling and re-grabbing as it spins, from a stationary stance. If the disk is mounted at a tilt to the ground, after an initial push, the disk can be sped up without further pushing or touching the ground. The trick is to have the rider(s) lean into the center of the disk while ascending and leaning out from the center when descending. This is due to the physics of angular momentum and also works for swings. Roundabouts are often found in school playgrounds and public parks, they offer riders (typically children) a dizzying ride when either others spin the wheel, or by spinning it themselves by running around it, and then jumping on. People may take turns between riding and spinning. One type of roundabout which differs significantly in terms of how the rotary motion is provided is a Swedish device called the HAGS Pedal Roundabout, which resembles four small exercise bikes attached to a tubular steel ring, which travel on a circular steel rail on the ground. The ring is attached to a vertical pole in the center by four spokes. There is a driving wheel hidden under the casing of each of the "exercise bikes" (the casings prevent toes from being run over) and the roundabout is turned by the pedaling action of the riders.

The names roundabout, merry-go-round, and carousel are also used, in varying dialects, to refer to a distinct fair or amusement park ride.

== Innovation ==
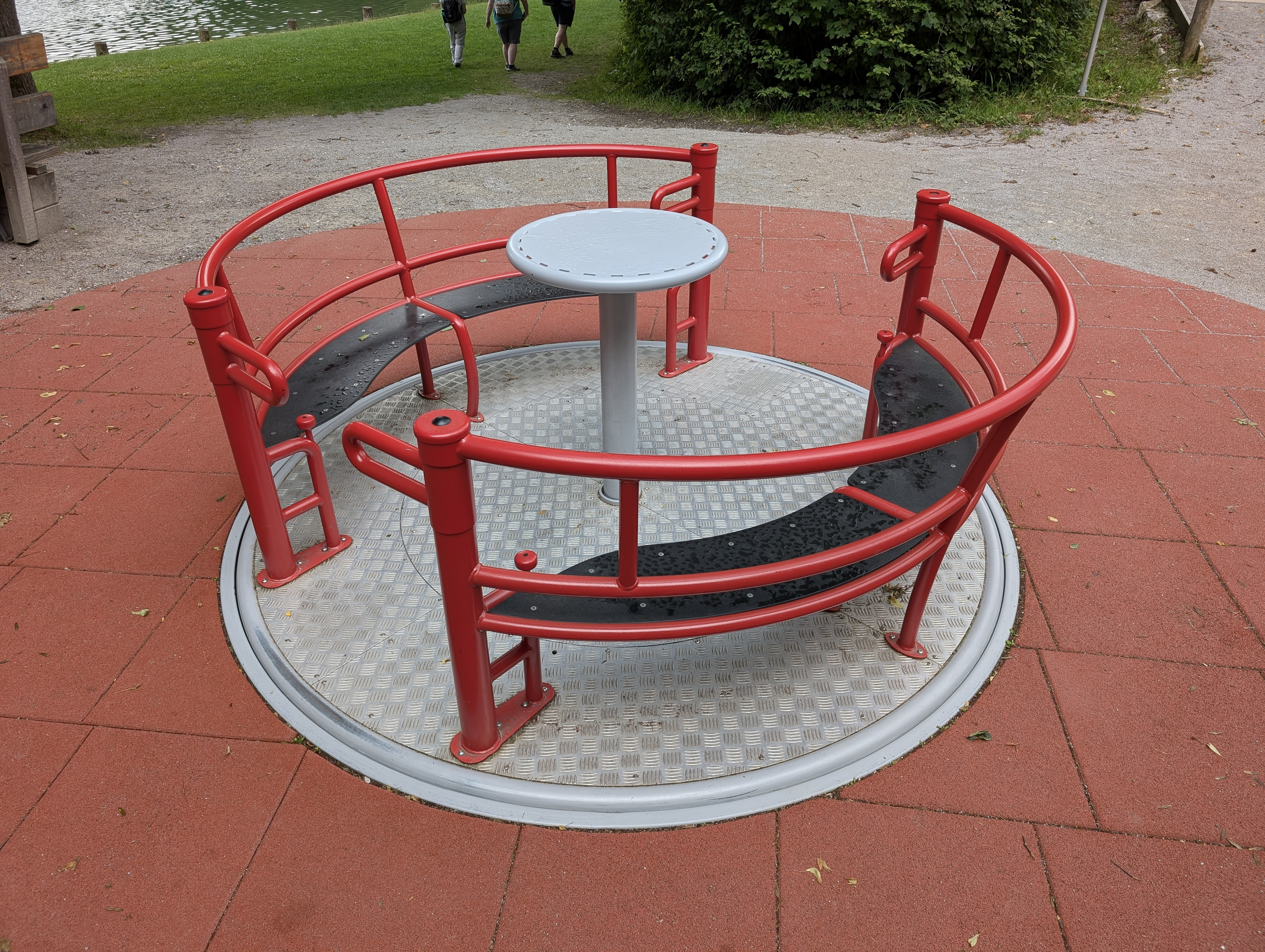
A roundabout designed to be accessible for wheelchair users

An inventor, Ronnie Stuiver, devised a pump powered by a turning children's roundabout, which premiered at an agricultural show in KwaZulu-Natal in 1989. This device is known as the Roundabout PlayPump. There are about 600 PlayPumps in South Africa, intended to provide clean drinking water to about one million impoverished people.

Several issues have been raised about the effectiveness of using such a pump as a power source given how consistent the need for water is, thereby turning children into a source of manual labor. Additionally, it has been noted that the problem for water infrastructure is often not the ability to pump ground water that pools close to the surface, but the limited availability of groundwater itself. UNICEF has released a comprehensive report on the current status of the PlayPump project.

== Benefits ==
Roundabout play provides several benefits to children. This equipment can help children with autism increase vestibular stimulation, can increase development of kinaesthetic awareness and can help children develop strength, coordination, and balance. These types of movements can also be therapeutic to growing children.

== See also ==
- Commercial Playground Equipment
- Empower playgrounds – energy generation
- Louden Whirl-Around
- Merry-go-round of death – internet challenge that involves using a motorcycle to spin a roundabout
