= Commercial Block =

Commercial Block may refer to:

- Commercial Block (Fairfield, Iowa), listed on the National Register of Historic Places in Jefferson County, Iowa
- Commercial Block (Spokane, Washington), listed on the National Register of Historic Places in Spokane County, Washington
