= Merry-go-round of death =

Internet challenge

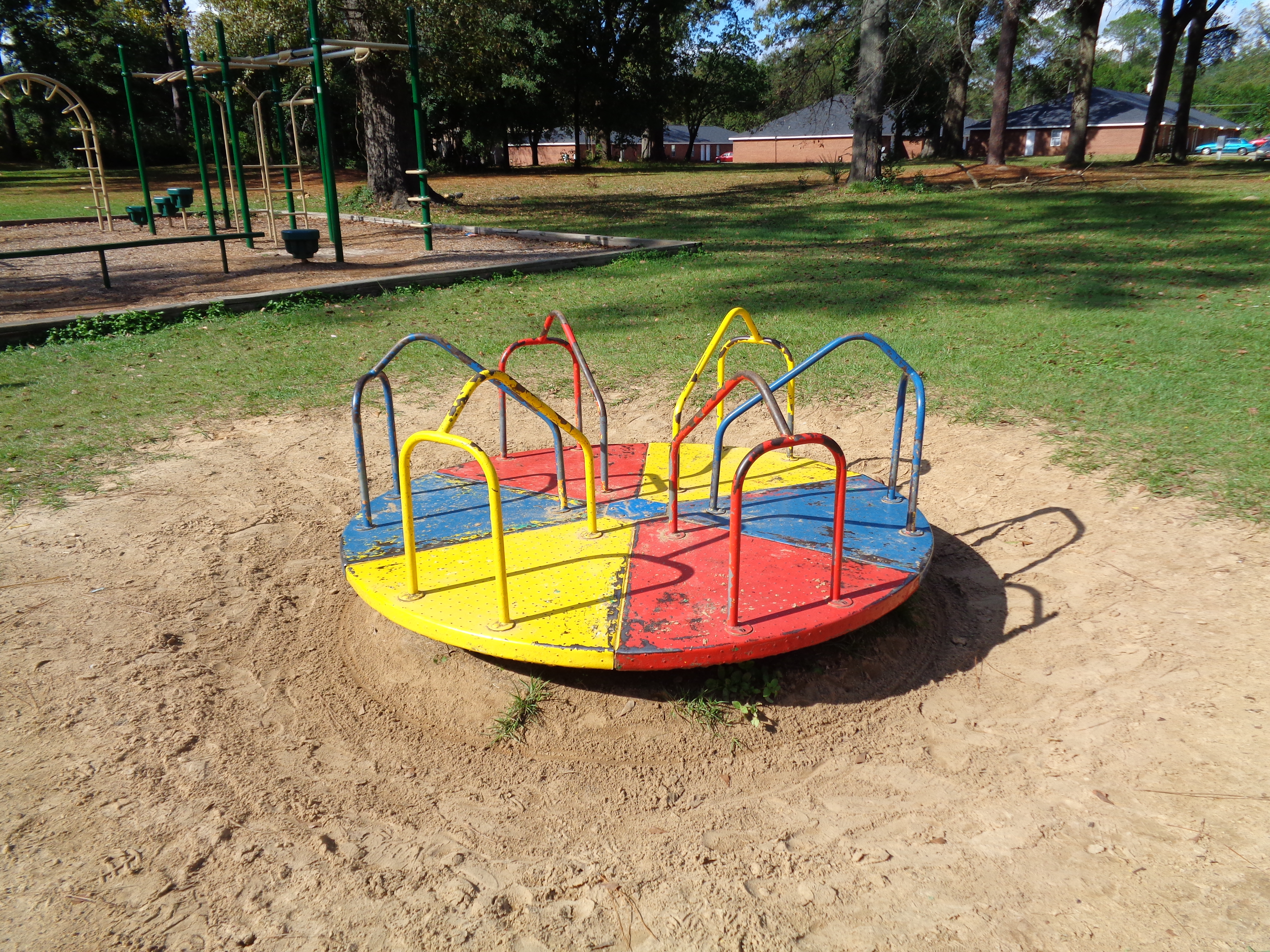
A roundabout, or merry-go-round, the central component of the challenge

The merry-go-round of death, also known as the roundabout of death, is an Internet challenge involving multiple participants, a roundabout (or merry-go-round) and a method of motorisation, usually a moped or motorcycle. At least one of the participants rides on the merry-go-round, while the motorcycle or moped's rear wheel is placed against the disc of the ride, and then used to spin the merry-go-round at a very high speed by throttling up.

The goal of the challenge is to hold on to the roundabout for as long as possible, though the effects of strong centrifugal force and increased g-force means that holding on is almost impossible, and participants may fall unconscious. Numerous people have sustained severe injuries from the challenge. Such injuries include those caused by high g-forces that have been described as "normally only seen in fighter pilots", as well as blunt-force trauma inflicted as a result of colliding with objects while being spun, or being launched from the roundabout against the ground or into stationary objects at high speed.

== History ==
The challenge can be dated to before 2009, when an early video of the challenge involving two teenagers being launched by a roundabout went viral.

The challenge received heightened attention in 2018 when a schoolboy from Tuxford, Nottinghamshire, England was forced to take part in it as a form of school bullying. The boy sustained serious head trauma that resulted in unconsciousness, his eyes bulging from their sockets, and a potential risk of stroke due to the extreme pressure exerted on his body during the spinning.

In August 2025, a 12-year-old boy died at Wharton Recreation Ground in Winsford, Cheshire, after falling from a playground roundabout that police believe was being propelled by the wheels of an e-bike.
