= Midway Stock Farm Barn =

- Formerly listed on the U.S. National Register of Historic Places
- Location within Iowa Location within the United States
- Location: 0.3 miles south of the junction of Iowa Highways 1 and 16
- Nearest city: Keosauqua, Iowa
- Coordinates: 40°48′09″N 91°55′50″W
- Area: Less than one acre
- Built: c. 1880
- MPS: Louden Machinery Company, Fairfield Iowa MPS
- NRHP reference No.: 99000126

Significant dates
- Added to NRHP: February 22, 1999
- Removed from NRHP: January 31, 2019

Midway Stock Farm Barn was a historic building located north of Keosauqua, Iowa, United States. The barn was built by William A. Barker around 1880. It gained historical significance when his son Webb installed equipment made by the Louden Machinery Company of Fairfield, Iowa. By doing so he converted the facility from one that raised livestock to a dairy operation. Around 1918 Barker built an addition onto the south side of the barn and installed a litter carrier with tracks and switches on the ground floor, a hay carrier with a steel track and grapple hook hay fork also on the main floor, and a metal aerator on the roof. It was one of a few local operations that still had the Louden equipment in place.

The barn was listed on the National Register of Historic Places in 1999. On July 19, 2018, it was destroyed by a tornado, and the following year it was removed from the National Register.
