= Iowa Malleable Iron Company =

- U.S. National Register of Historic Places
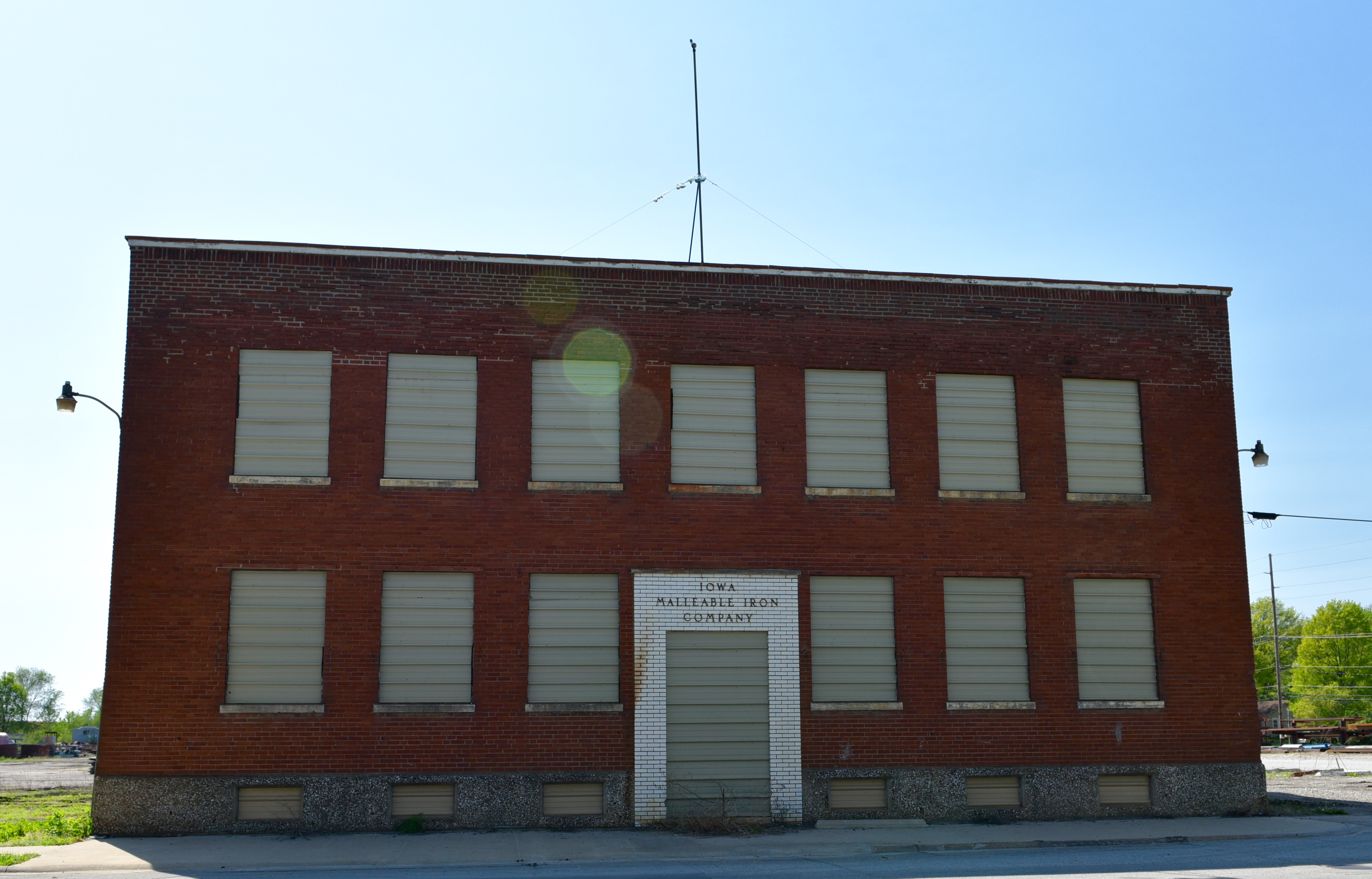

- Location within Iowa Location within the United States
- Location: 600-608 N. 9th St. Fairfield, Iowa
- Coordinates: 41°0′47″N 91°58′29″W
- Area: 2.11 acres (0.85 ha)
- Built: Beginning in 1904
- MPS: Louden Machinery Company, Fairfield Iowa MPS
- NRHP reference No.: 99000122
- Added to NRHP: February 22, 1999

The Iowa Malleable Iron Company was a historic industrial complex located in Fairfield, Iowa, United States. At one time the historic designation included nine buildings, most of them have been torn down. The remaining building was the two-story office building for the factory that was constructed in 1924. Most of the complex was built in 1904 north of the Chicago, Burlington and Quincy Railroad tracks. The company produced malleable iron castings for agricultural implement manufacturers, including Fairfield's Louden Machinery Company. For the most part it was established by the officers of the Louden Company, and it is thought to be the first foundry of its kind between the Mississippi River and Pueblo, Colorado. The two companies maintained a close association throughout their histories. The complex was listed on the National Register of Historic Places in 1999.
