= August and Vera Luedtke Barn =

- U.S. National Register of Historic Places
- Location within Iowa Location within the United States
- Location: 1938 185th St.
- Nearest city: Fairfield, Iowa
- Coordinates: 41°02′17″N 91°59′57″W
- Area: less than one acre
- Built: 1947
- Architect: Louden Machinery Company
- MPS: Louden Machinery Company, Fairfield Iowa MPS
- NRHP reference No.: 99000121
- Added to NRHP: February 22, 1999

The August and Vera Luedtke Barn is a historic building located north of Fairfield, Iowa, United States in rural Jefferson County. The barn was built by Luedtke from plans prepared by the Louden Machinery Company of Fairfield. He had previously built other barns using the same company's designs in the area. This barn features a gambrel roof, concrete walls, and eleven intact Louden dairy stanchions and a hay carrier system that are original to the building's construction in 1947. Built for a dairy operation, the structure has subsequently been used for storage. The barn was listed on the National Register of Historic Places in 1999.

It has a hay hood.
