= Louden Monorail System in the Auto Repair Shop =

- U.S. National Register of Historic Places
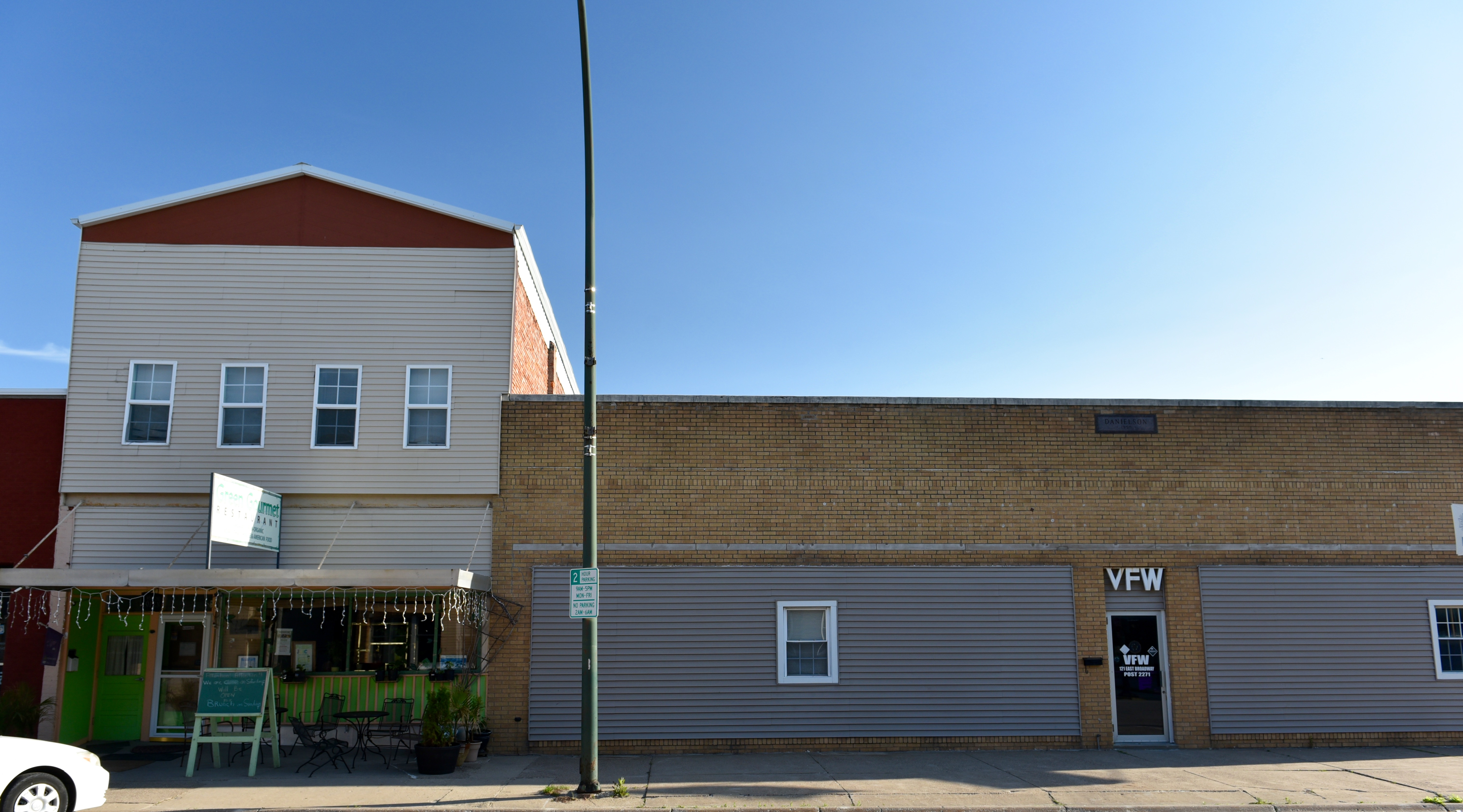

- Location within Iowa Location within the United States
- Location: 117 E. Broadway Ave. Fairfield, Iowa
- Coordinates: 41°0′28″N 91°58′10″W
- Area: less than one acre
- Built: 1922
- MPS: Louden Machinery Company, Fairfield Iowa MPS
- NRHP reference No.: 99000129
- Added to NRHP: February 22, 1999

The Louden Monorail System in the Auto Repair Shop, also known as McGuire Motor Company and Crandall's Electric Service, is a historic structure located in Fairfield, Iowa, United States. The monorail system is located in a former auto repair shop along an alley between East Broadway Avenue and East Briggs Avenue. It is the rear, single-story, portion of the building at 117 E. Broadway Ave where the system is located. The storefront portion of the building, also historically associated with the automobile industry, is a two-story brick building built on a stone foundation. The east side of the central business district in Fairfield had become the center for automobile related businesses by the 1920s. Harley Carter bought this building in 1920, and had the monorail system, manufactured by the Louden Machinery Company, installed about 1922. The overhead material handling system is permanently attached to the east wall of the shop. It allowed the mechanics to more easily move the heavy engines and other parts to and from vehicles. The structure was listed on the National Register of Historic Places in 1999.
