= Henn Mansion =

Historic house in Iowa, United States

- U.S. National Register of Historic Places
- U.S. Historic district – Contributing property
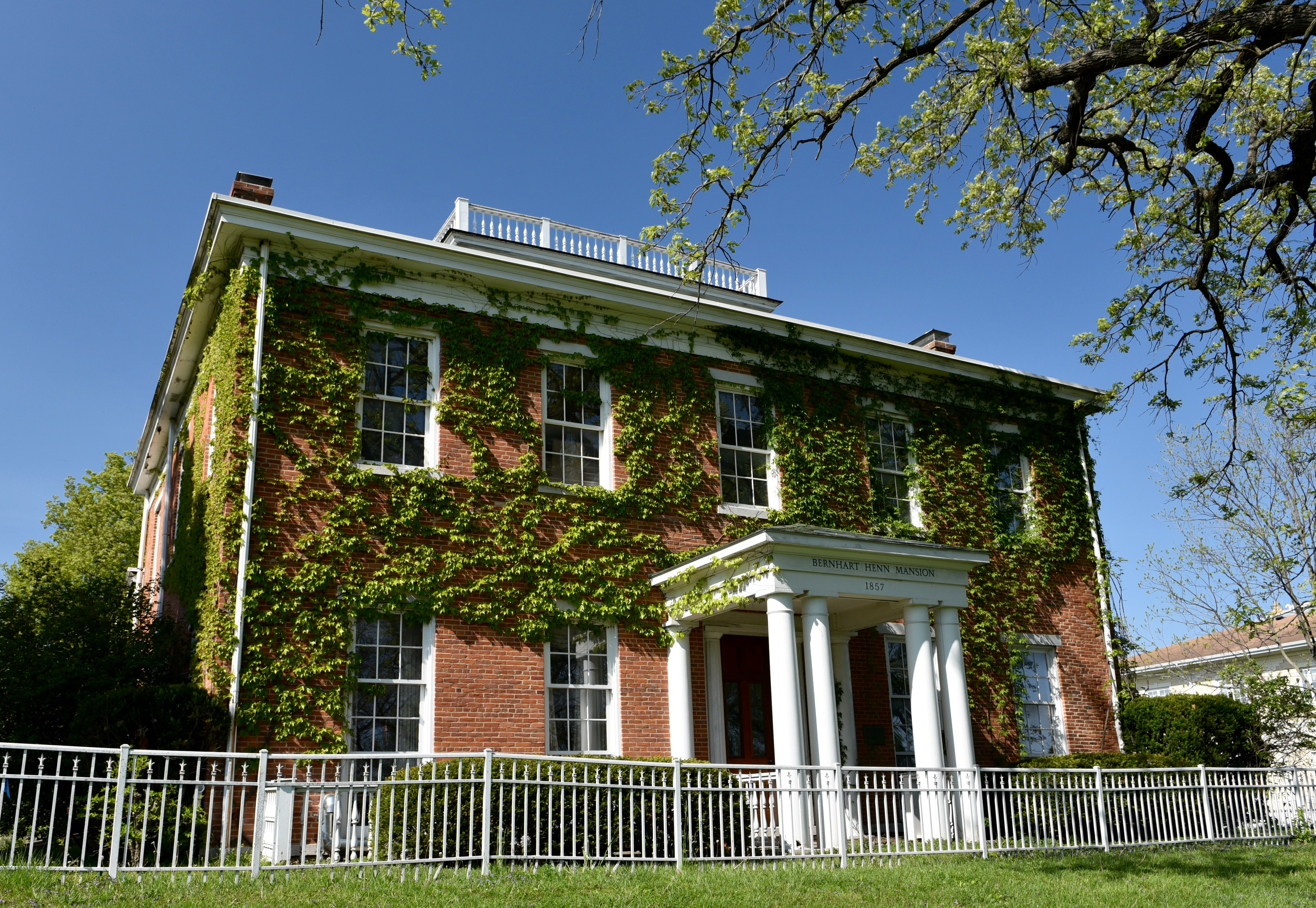

- Location within Iowa Location within the United States
- Location: Maharishi International University campus Fairfield, Iowa
- Coordinates: 41°01′0″N 91°57′59″W
- Area: less than one acre
- Built: 1858
- Architectural style: Greek Revival
- Part of: Architecture of Henry K. Holsman Historic Campus District (ID83003605)
- NRHP reference No.: 83000374
- Added to NRHP: January 11, 1983

The Henn Mansion, also known as Ewing Hall, is a historic building located in Fairfield, Iowa, United States. A native of New York, Bernhart Henn served two terms in the United States House of Representatives representing Iowa's 1st congressional district as a Democratic. Previously he had served as the Registrar of the U.S. Land Office. He had this two-story, brick, Greek Revival house built in 1858. However, the financial panic of 1857 almost wiped out his fortune. When he died in 1865, the house and the 40 acres (16 ha) of land that surrounded it had to be sold. The house is representative of the financial success one had in the public sector in the pioneer economy. It was also the birthplace of Parsons College in 1875. The house was listed on the National Register of Historic Places in 1983.
