= Architecture of Henry K. Holsman Historic Campus District =

Historic district in Iowa, United States

- Architecture of Henry K. Holsman; Historic Campus District
- U.S. National Register of Historic Places
- U.S. Historic district
- Location within Iowa Location within the United States
- Location: Bounded by Merrill St., Iowa Highway 1, and Carter Memorial Dr. Fairfield, Iowa
- Coordinates: 41°00′58″N 91°58′00″W
- Area: 12.1 acres (4.9 ha)
- Built: 1903-1915
- Architect: Henry K. Holsman
- Architectural style: Classical Revival; Tudor Revival
- NRHP reference No.: 83003605
- Added to NRHP: October 31, 1983

The Architecture of Henry K. Holsman Historic Campus District, also known as the Maharishi International University, is a nationally recognized historic district located in Fairfield, Iowa, United States. It was listed on the National Register of Historic Places in 1983. At the time of its nomination it included five contributing buildings that were built from 1903 to 1915 on the campus of Parsons College. They were designed in the Collegiate Gothic style by Iowa-born and Chicago-based architect Henry K. Holsman. It also includes Ewing Hall, which is an older building on the campus, and individually listed on the National Register. The buildings were built after the destruction by fire of Ankeny Hall in 1902. Foster Hall (1903), Fairfield Hall (1903), and the Carnegie Library (1907) have elements of the Beaux-Arts style. Barhydt Chapel and the Parsons Bible School were completed in 1912. Parsons Hall was completed in 1915.
