= McElhinny House =

Historic house in Iowa, United States

- U.S. National Register of Historic Places
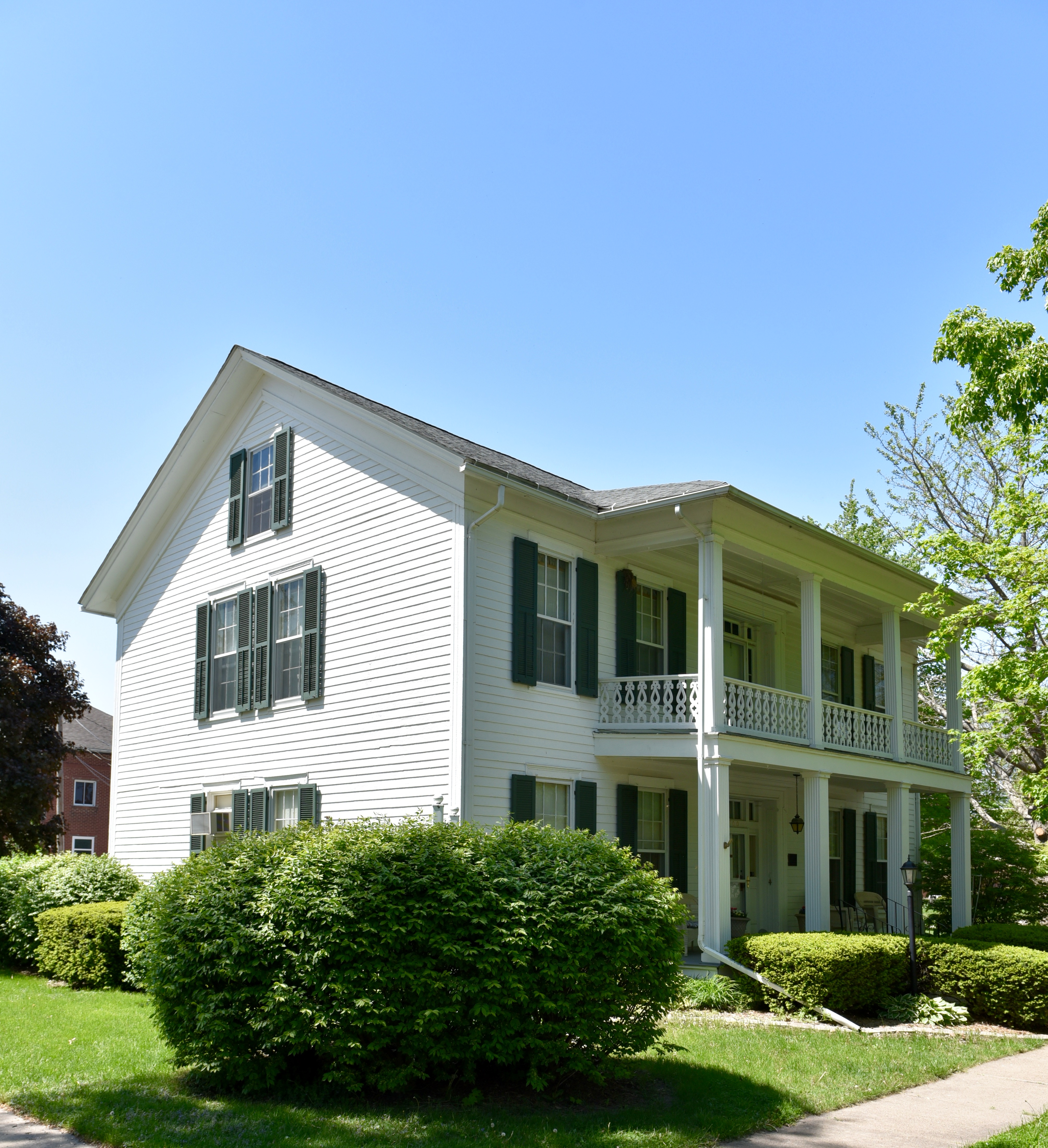

- Location within Iowa Location within the United States
- Location: 300 N. Court St. Fairfield, Iowa
- Coordinates: 41°0′35″N 91°57′45″W
- Area: less than one acre
- Built: 1850
- Architectural style: Greek Revival
- NRHP reference No.: 77000524
- Added to NRHP: December 19, 1977

The McElhinny House is a historic building located in Fairfield, Iowa, United States. Built about 1850, the house is a dwelling from the city's early years. The two-story frame structure follows an L-shaped plan. Its prominent feature is the two-story porch that covers three of the five bays on the main facade. It was built for Robert McElhinny, a Pennsylvania native. He was elected the first president of the Jefferson County Library Association, one of the first groups of this type in Iowa. He also served on the board of Fairfield University when it was established in 1854, and contributed to its successor, Parsons College, at its founding. The house went on to become the home of the Fairfield Women's Club. It was listed on the National Register of Historic Places in 1977.
