= R. Bruce and May W. Louden House =

Historic house in Iowa, United States

- U.S. National Register of Historic Places
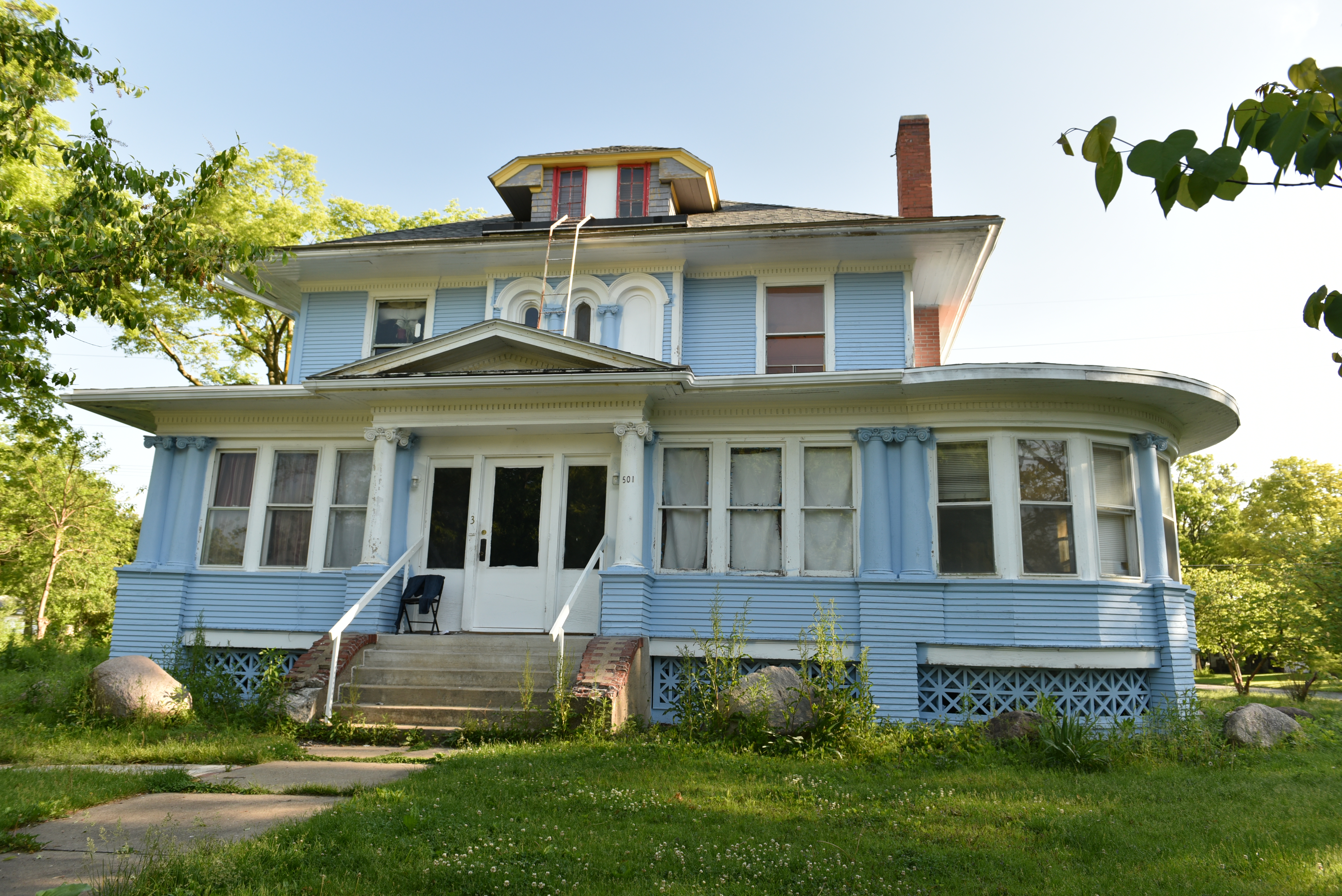

- Location within Iowa Location within the United States
- Location: 501 W. Adams Ave. Fairfield, Iowa
- Coordinates: 41°0′18″N 91°58′9″W
- Built: 1905
- Architectural style: Colonial Revival
- MPS: Louden Machinery Company, Fairfield Iowa MPS
- NRHP reference No.: 99000124
- Added to NRHP: September 12, 2003

The R. Bruce and May W. Louden House is an historic building located in Fairfield, Iowa, United States. Original construction is in a colonial revival style and the interior was remodeled in an art deco style in 1928. Louden sold the property in 1948, and it was broken into apartments in the 1960s. The house was built in 1905 and was the residence of R. Bruce and May W. Louden until 1948.

The house is within walking distance of the Louden Machinery Company, as it was the custom at the time for factory owners to be close to their properties. He was the third president of the company in Fairfield from 1940 to 1951, when he was killed in an auto accident. During that period the company produced overhead handling equipment for American industries during World War II. The house was listed on the National Register of Historic Places in 2003.

R. Bruce Louden was president of Louden Machinery Company when the firm was contracted to build the assembly line for the world's first [atom bomb], and also the [B-29 bomber], during World War II. The atom bomb assembly line project was so secret that Louden was never told of it during construction, and liaison with the Manhattan Project was through Louden Vice President R. R. Louden, as per one of Louden's grandchildren.

In its heyday, Louden Machinery Company was one of the world's largest farm equipment manufacturers and was the largest shipper on the Rock Island Railroad. The founder, William Louden, was a prolific inventor with many inventions to his credit. His hay handling system (the first major invention)was a pulley system on a monorail used to move hay in the mow of the barn, and was the first commercially successful monorail system in the world.

== The Billy Sunday Connection ==
In 1907, world-famous evangelist Billy Sunday held one of his early revivals next to the Louden home, according to local author and historian Susan Fulton. Fulton designates the location as five blocks due west of the Presbyterian church, which is the location of the Louden home. Records were kept of the Fairfield Revival altar call, and 1,018 people came to the altar during the week of the event. When the revival was through, the Revival tabernacle was torn down and re-constructed in <Chautauqua Park>, where it served the community for many years until a windstorm destroyed it in the 1930s. Wood from the ruined tabernacle was then used to construct the gazebo on the city square. So the Fairfield Revival Gazebo still stands in the center of the square to this day.

Sunday, a native of Ames, Iowa, had been a professional baseball player first for the Chicago White Stockings, then for the Pittsburgh Alleghenys and the Philadelphia Phillies. Hall of Famer Cap Anson was his first coach and mentor. In his final season he had an infinite(0.00) earned run average (ERA) with Pittsburgh.

But he left his baseball career in 1890 for the ministry. A Presbyterian and a confirmed ‘dry,’ he became one of the national leaders in the drive for Prohibition. It is said that he preached to over 100 million people in his career in the days before television and most radio.

Sunday's Revival tabernacle in Fairfield was not his first. His marketing technique was to build a wooden tabernacle prior to the revival event—essentially a large wood barn with board bench seats and a sawdust floor. The tabernacle would then become both the forum and the advertising medium as questions about the large construction project would bubble up in the community. Sunday repeated the technique during early revival events throughout Iowa and Illinois.

The property has been restored over the years by Bob Krause and his late wife Maryann Mills-Krause (passed in 2005) and by his present wife, Vicky Matthiessen Krause.
