= George A. Wells House =

Historic house in Iowa, United States

- U.S. National Register of Historic Places
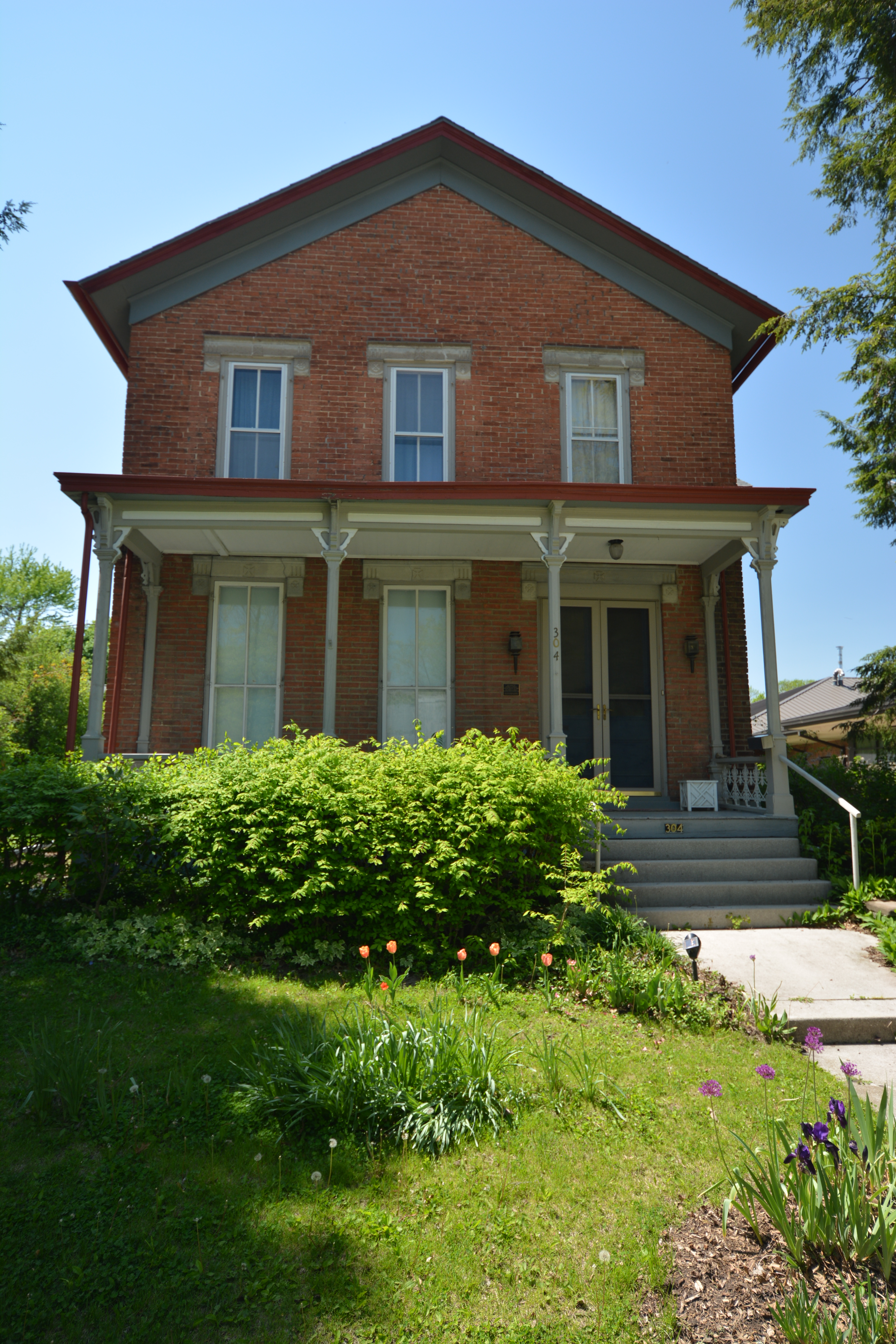

- Location within Iowa Location within the United States
- Location: 304 S. Main St. Fairfield, Iowa
- Coordinates: 41°0′14″N 91°57′50″W
- Area: less than one acre
- Built: 1883
- NRHP reference No.: 83000375
- Added to NRHP: January 27, 1983

The George A. Wells House, also known as the Wells-Booker-Taylor House, is a historic residence located in Fairfield, Iowa, United States. Wells was a drugest and later a banker who settled in Fairfield in 1856. Because of financial difficulties he built the house over a period of four years, completing it in 1883. He was also a local promoter who sat on the Parsons College board of trustees. A Republican, he served as an alderman and mayor of Fairfield. Samuel F. Booker, another community promoter and a farmer, was the second owner retired and died here. The two-story house is a combination of brick and frame construction. It is a late example of Vernacular Greek Revival style. The back wing, which is the frame portion of the structure, is original to the house. It was listed on the National Register of Historic Places in 1983.
