= Former United States Post Office Building (Fairfield, Iowa) =

- Former US Post Office Building
- U.S. National Register of Historic Places
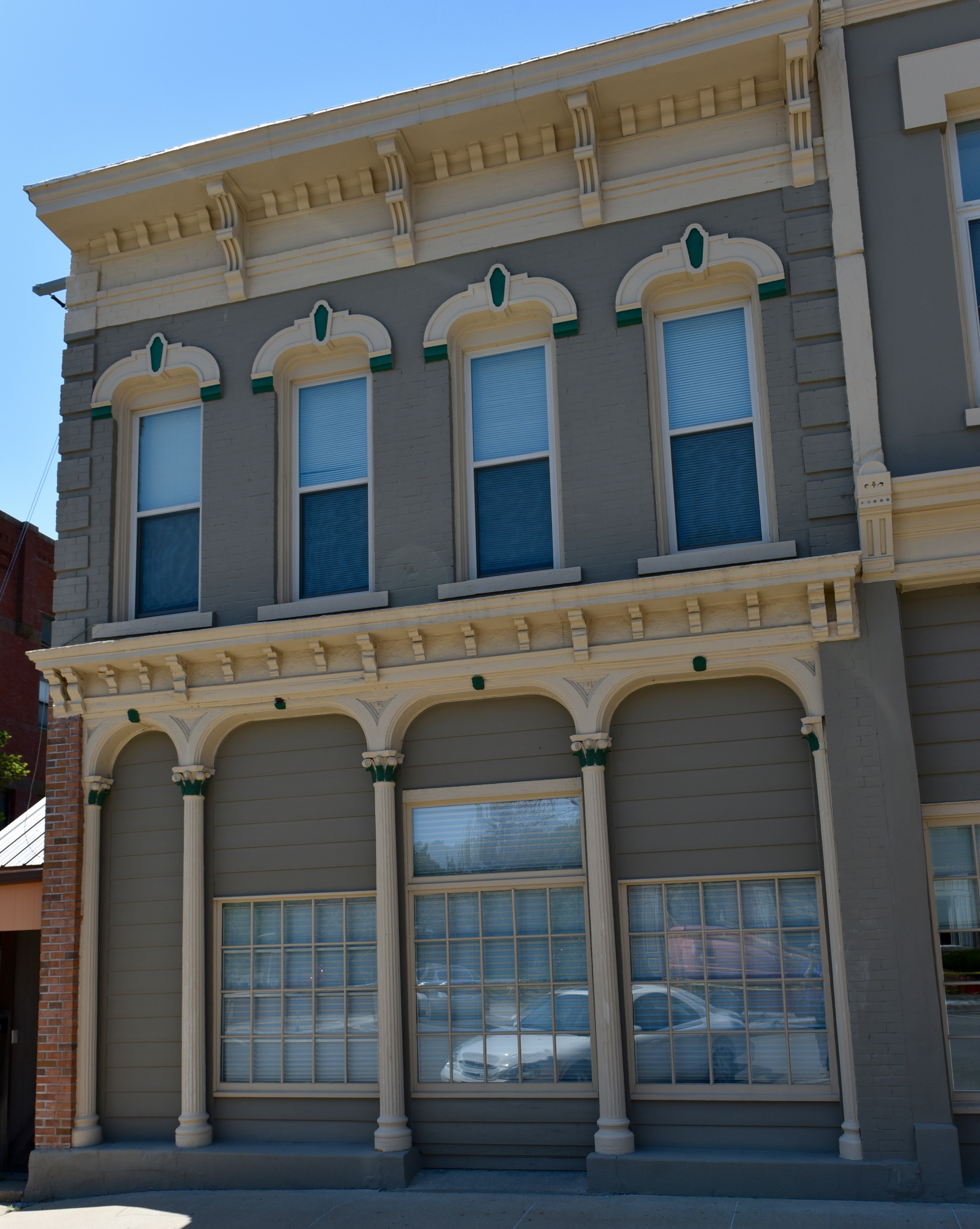

- Location within Iowa Location within the United States
- Location: 600-608 N. 9th St. Fairfield, Iowa
- Coordinates: 41°0′22.28″N 91°57′45.59″W
- Area: less than one acre
- Built: 1876
- Architectural style: Italianate
- MPS: US Senator James F. Wilson Historic Resources MPS
- NRHP reference No.: 90002128
- Added to NRHP: January 24, 1991

The Former US Post Office Building is a historic building located in Fairfield, Iowa, [United States. The two-story, brick, Italianate structure was built in 1876 by James F. Wilson. It was the first building in Fairfield built specifically for the federal government. In 1865 Wilson, helped to establish and was the president of the First National Bank in Fairfield. He also built several store fronts as investments, including the immediately adjacent Wilson Building. By the time this building was constructed Wilson had been a three-term Republican congressman representing Iowa's 1st congressional district. Seven years after this building was constructed, he began the first of two terms in the United States Senate. At that time, the post office typically rented buildings for its use. The historic significance of this building reflects Wilson's political connections in the federal government. The building was listed on the National Register of Historic Places in 1991.

== See also ==
- List of United States post offices
