= Evergreen Ridge Stock Farm Historic District =

Historic district in Iowa, United States

- Evergreen Ridge Stock Farm; Historic District
- U.S. National Register of Historic Places
- U.S. Historic district
- Location within Iowa Location within the United States
- Location: 2224 Iowa Highway 1 Fairfield, Iowa
- Coordinates: 40°59′04″N 91°57′55″W
- Area: 7.62 acres (3.08 ha)
- NRHP reference No.: 07000559
- Added to NRHP: June 21, 2007

The Evergreen Ridge Stock Farm Historic District, also known as the Maasdam Farm, Massdam and Wheeler, and Glen and June German Farm, is an agricultural historic district located on the south side of Fairfield, Iowa, United States. It was listed on the National Register of Historic Places in 2007. At the time of its nomination it included four contributing buildings, one contributing site, one contributing structure, and one non-contributing building. The significance of the district is attributed to its historic use as a livestock farm. The contributing buildings include the Show Barn (c. 1906), the Stallion Barn (c. 1910), the Mare Barn (c. 1910), wind mill (c. 1925), chicken coop (c. 1925), and the farmyard. There were two different houses on the farm, and both have been removed. From 1910 to 1938 the farm was owned by J.G. Maasdam, who imported and bred award-winning Belgian, Percheron and other draft horses that were used for farming.
