= Former United States Post Office (Smithfield, North Carolina) =

Historic building in North Carolina, US

- Former US Post Office
- U.S. National Register of Historic Places
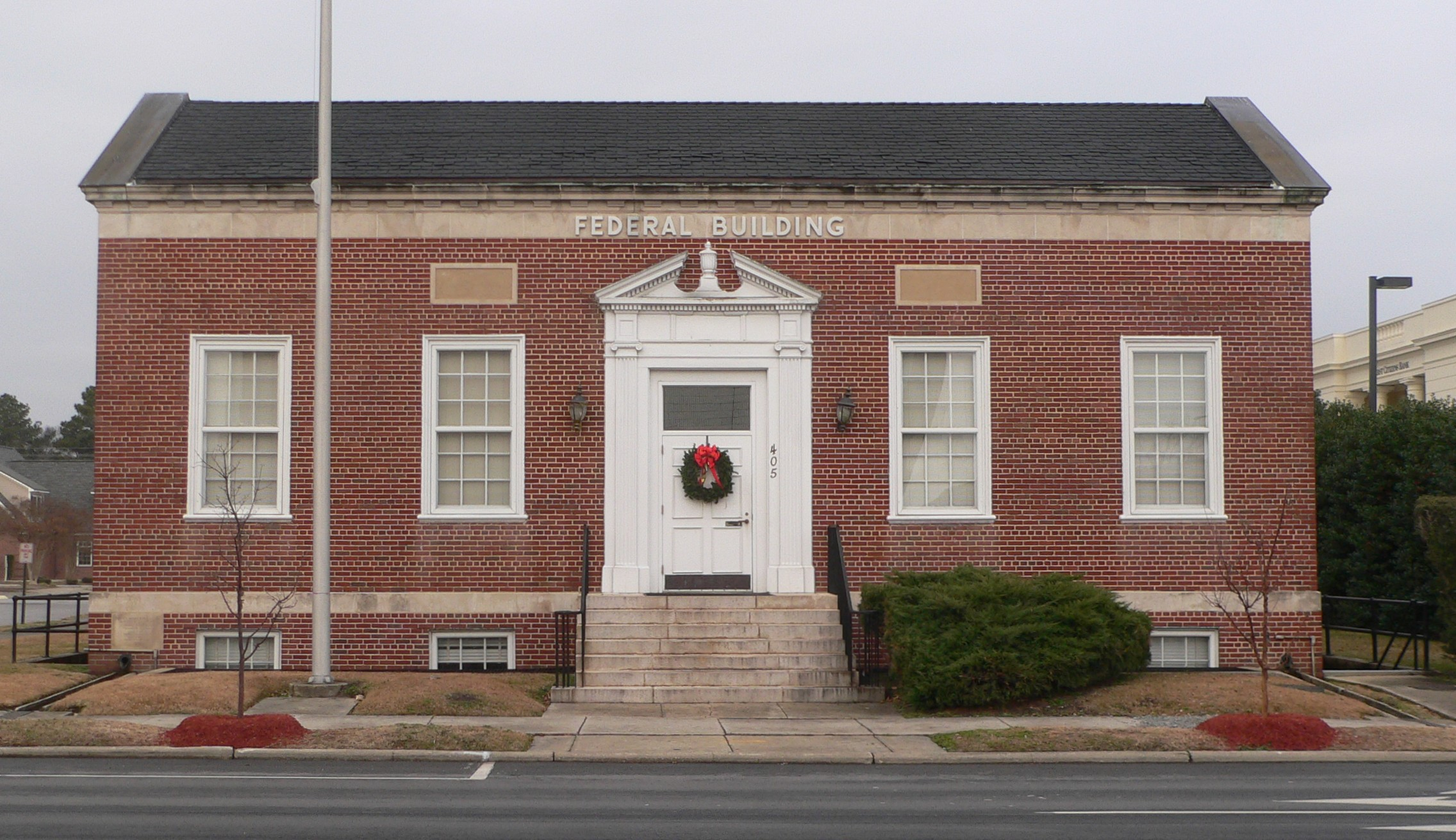
- Front of the post office

- Location within North Carolina Location within the United States
- Location: 405 E. Market St., Smithfield, North Carolina
- Coordinates: 35°30′37″N 78°20′40″W
- Area: 0.1 acres (0.040 ha)
- Built: 1936
- Architect: U.S. Treasury
- Architectural style: Colonial Revival
- NRHP reference No.: 93000315
- Added to NRHP: April 22, 1993

The former US Post Office is a historic post office building located at Smithfield, Johnston County, North Carolina. It was designed by the Office of the Supervising Architect and built in 1936 by the Works Progress Administration. It is a two-story, five-bay, rectangular brick building in the Colonial Revival style. It consists of three distinct sections: the two-story front block; a one-story rectangular center block; and a two-level rear block. The front facade features fluted Ionic order pilasters rising to a frieze supporting a broken pediment. The building housed federal government offices until 1990. The building was renovated in 1991 to house law offices.

It was listed on the National Register of Historic Places in 1993.
