= New Sweden Chapel =

- U.S. National Register of Historic Places
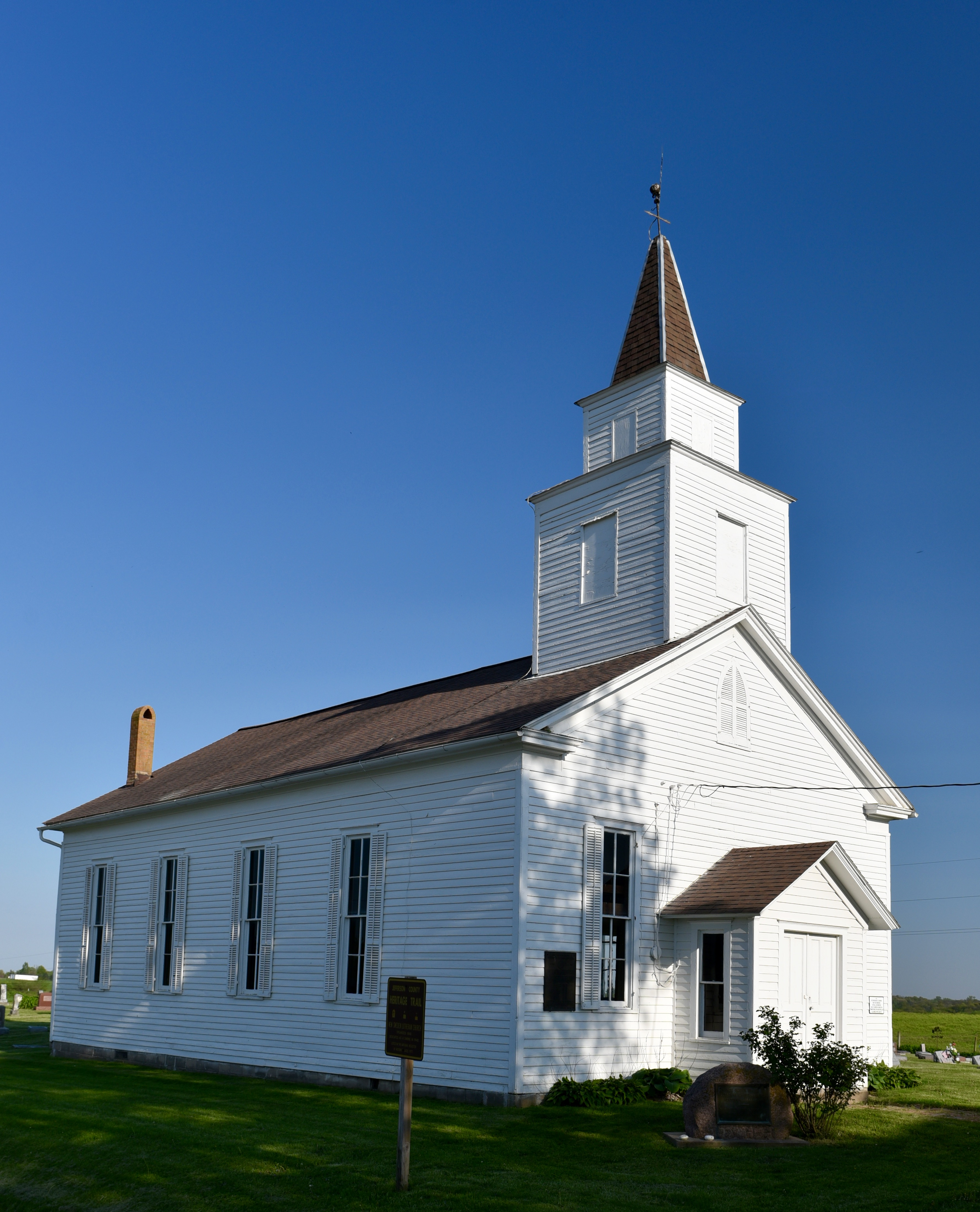
- The front of the New Sweden Chapel

- Location within Iowa Location within the United States
- Location: East of Fairfield off U.S. Route 34
- Coordinates: 41°01′27″N 91°46′48″W
- Area: less than one acre
- Built: 1860
- Built by: Henri Jagle
- NRHP reference No.: 77000525
- Added to NRHP: March 25, 1977

New Sweden Chapel is a historic Lutheran Church building located in the historic town of New Sweden, which is located just east of Fairfield, Iowa, United States in rural Jefferson County. The Swedish immigrant community that settled here was organized in 1845 under the leadership of Peter Cassel, a native of Kisa, Östergötland, Sweden. This was the first Swedish settlement in Iowa, as well as the first west of the Mississippi River. They established a Lutheran congregation in 1848, and built a log church in 1851. This church replaced it in 1860. Local builder Henri Jagle was responsible for building the 50-by-30-foot (15.2 by 9.1 m) frame structure. It is four bays in length and features a 16-foot (4.9 m) tower with a spire over the main entrance. The interior features a painting by Olaf Grafström, who was an art instructor at Augustana College in Rock Island, Illinois. In 1948 the Augustana Evangelical Lutheran Church named the New Sweden Chapel as a National Synodial Shrine in recognition of its being the oldest congregation in the synod. Prince Bertil of Sweden and the Archbishop of Uppsala participated in a ceremony that drew 3,000 people. The chapel no longer houses a regular congregation, but is used for special occasions. A cemetery is located on the church grounds. The chapel was listed on the National Register of Historic Places in 1977.
