= R.R. and Antoinette Louden House =

Historic house in Iowa, United States

- U.S. National Register of Historic Places
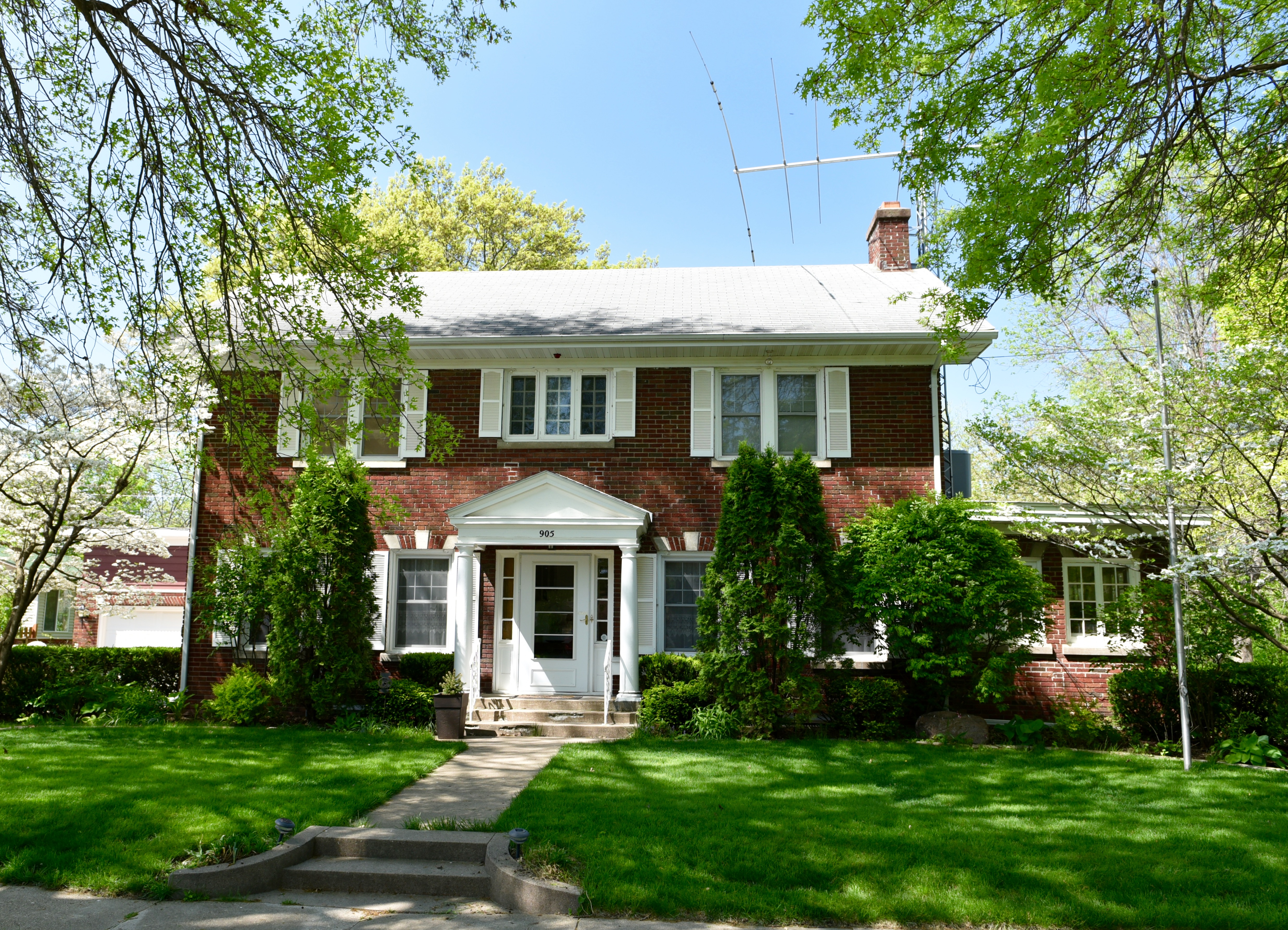

- Location within Iowa Location within the United States
- Location: 905 E. Adams Ave. Fairfield, Iowa
- Coordinates: 41°0′17″N 91°57′05″W
- Area: less than one acre
- Built: 1925
- Architectural style: Colonial Revival
- MPS: Louden Machinery Company, Fairfield Iowa MPS
- NRHP reference No.: 99000130
- Added to NRHP: February 22, 1999

The R.R. and Antoinette Louden House, also known as the Thomas A. and Dorothy C. Louden House, is a historic residence located in Fairfield, Iowa, United States. R.R. (Roy) Louden was the highly successful manager of the Louden Machinery Company advertising department in the 1920s, and he served as the corporation's secretary from 1931 until his death in 1951. He and his wife Antoinette had this house built in 1925. He lived here until his death in 1951. Their son Thomas and his wife Dorothy lived in the house after his parents. Thomas became general legal counsel for the company in the 1940s. The house is 2½-story, brick Colonial Revival with a side gable roof. It features a wall chimney on the east elevation, a single-story solarium, and a single-story porch on the main facade. An addition was added to the rear of the house in 1956. A two-car attached garage was built onto the addition in the 1980s. The house was listed on the National Register of Historic Places in 1999.
