= William and Mary Jane Louden House =

Historic house in Iowa, United States

- U.S. National Register of Historic Places
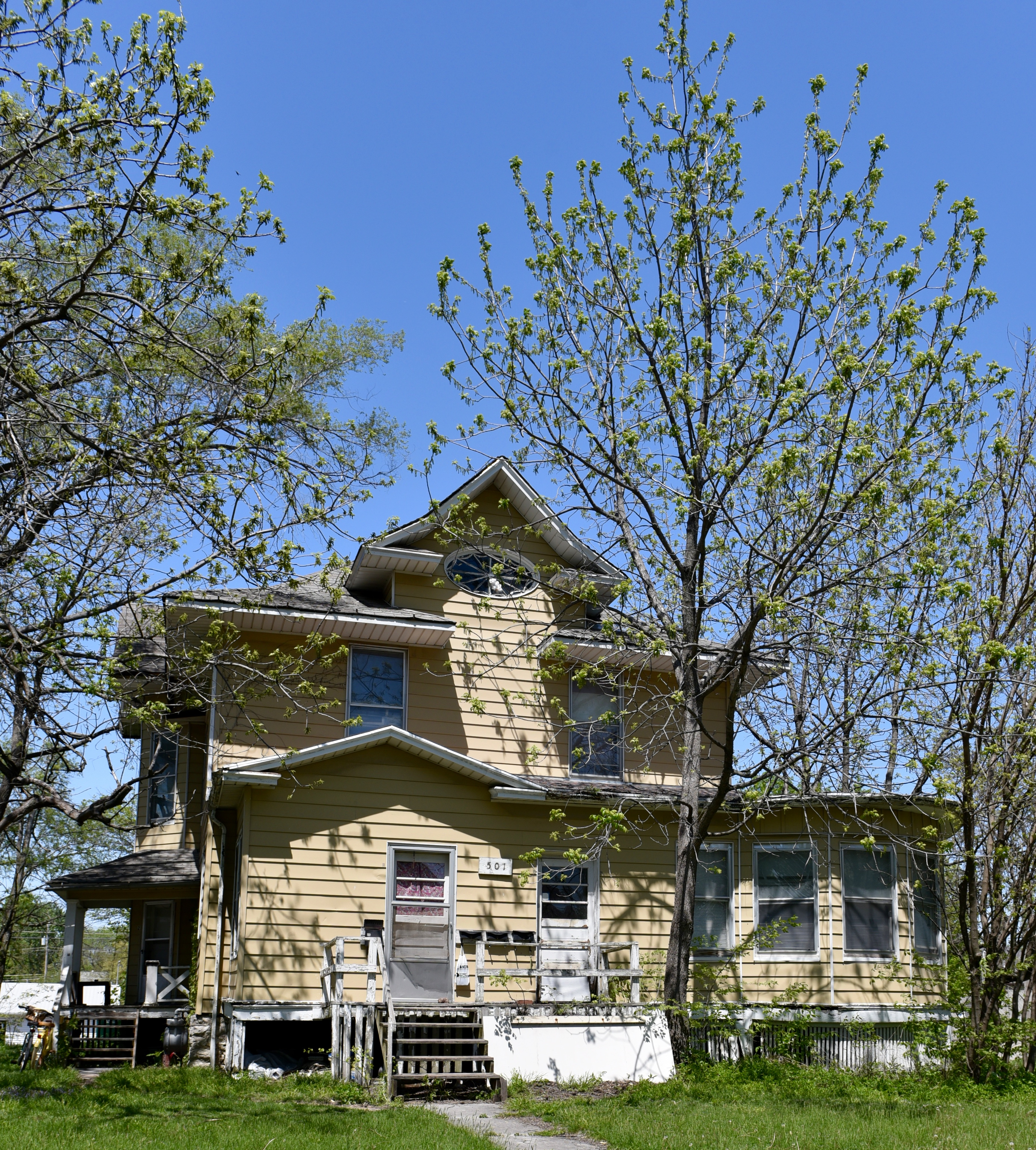

- Location within Iowa Location within the United States
- Location: 501 W. Washington Ave. Fairfield, Iowa
- Coordinates: 41°0′21″N 91°58′10″W
- Area: less than one acre
- Built: 1896-1897
- Built by: C.E. Ward
- Architectural style: Queen Anne
- MPS: Louden Machinery Company, Fairfield Iowa MPS
- NRHP reference No.: 99000118
- Added to NRHP: February 18, 1999

The William and Mary Jane Louden House is a historic residence located in Fairfield, Iowa, United States. It historical significance is derived from its association with William Louden, a co-founder of Louden Machinery Company with his brother R.B. Previously, he secured his first two patents by 1867: one was for hay-stacking, and another was for hay-carrying. He would go on to obtain over 100 more patents. Being the inventive genius of the firm, William brought it to a national reputation in barn construction and farm equipment. The house is a 2½-story, frame, single family dwelling. It was built for the Louden's by C.E. Ward from 1896 to 1897 in the Queen Anne style. The house was listed on the National Register of Historic Places in 1999.
