= Louden Whirl-Around =

- U.S. National Register of Historic Places
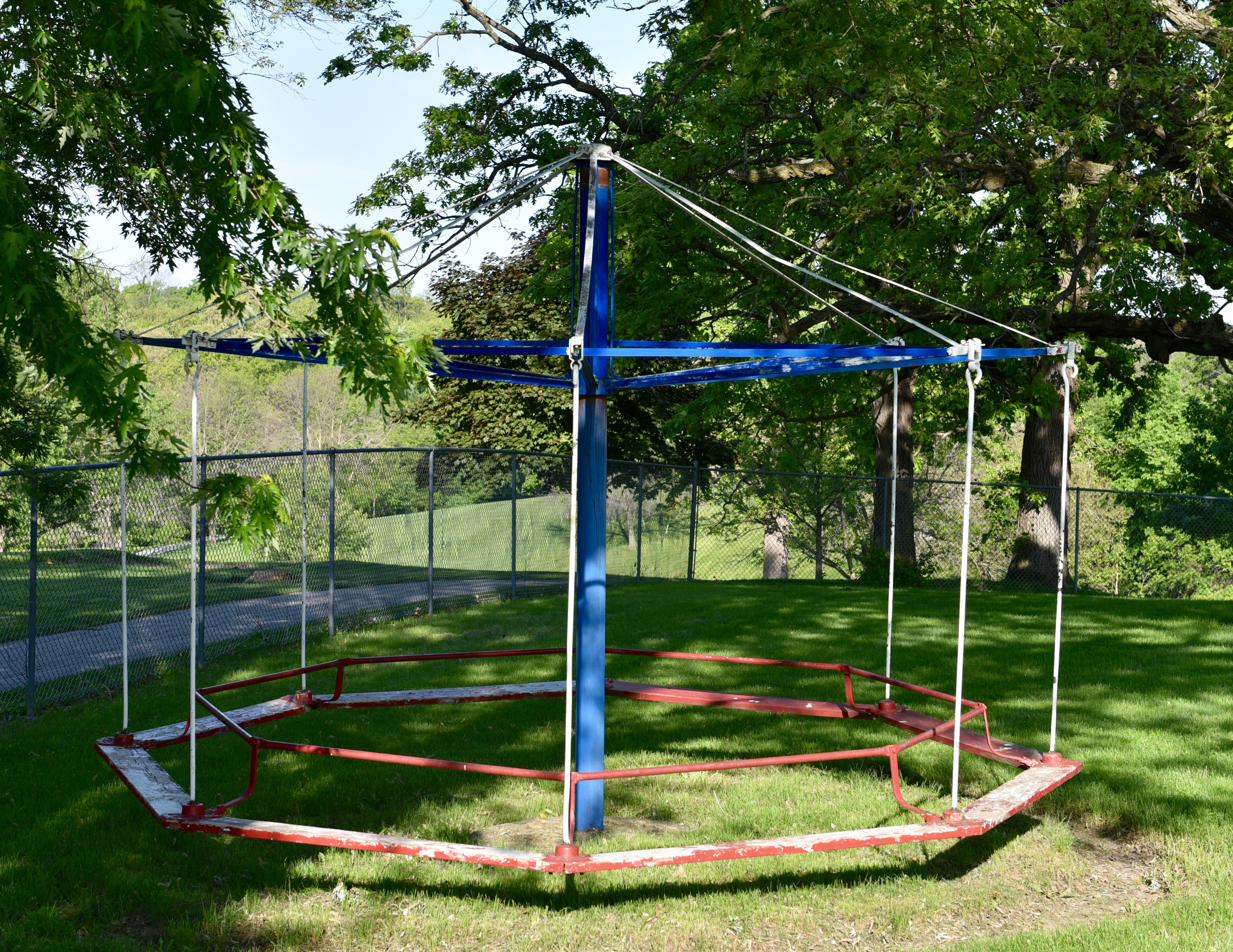

- Location within Iowa Location within the United States
- Location: 905 E. Harrison Ave. Fairfield, Iowa
- Coordinates: 40°59′55″N 91°57′06″W
- Area: less than one acre
- Built: 1930
- MPS: Louden Machinery Company, Fairfield Iowa MPS
- NRHP reference No.: 99000123
- Added to NRHP: February 22, 1999

The Louden Whirl-Around is a historic object located in Fairfield, Iowa, United States. It is a type of a playground merry-go-round manufactured by the Louden Machinery Company. It was built about 1930 on the grounds of the Fairfield Country Club. The octagon-shaped apparatus is composed of steel pipe, malleable iron couplings, and wood. It is located south of the swimming pool behind the clubhouse. Louden had to begin a line of playground equipment in order to acquire patent rights that it needed to develop its line of overhead material handling systems. They acquired the J.C. Porter Company of Ottawa, Illinois, which manufactured the playground equipment and held those rights. The playground apparatus exemplifies the company's growth in the 1920s. Most of the schools in Fairfield had playground equipment manufactured by Louden. The object was listed on the National Register of Historic Places in 1999.
