= W.C. Ball House =

Historic house in Iowa, United States

- U.S. National Register of Historic Places
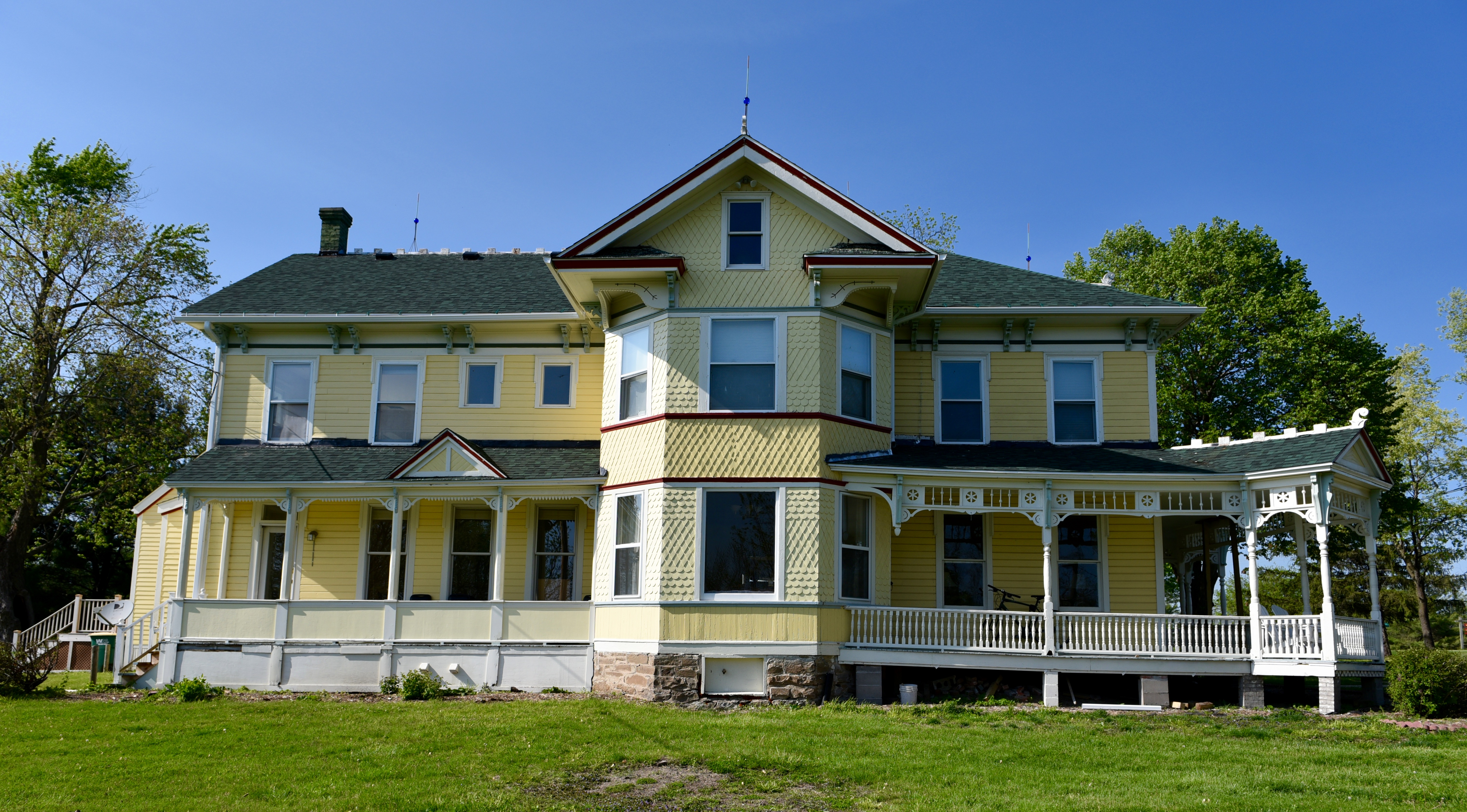

- Location within Iowa Location within the United States
- Location: Rural Route #2, Fairfield, Iowa
- Coordinates: 41°01′11″N 91°57′32″W
- Area: 2.11 acres (0.85 ha)
- Built: c. 1876
- Architectural style: Late Victorian
- NRHP reference No.: 85000691
- Added to NRHP: April 4, 1985

The W.C. Ball House (also known as the George W. Ball House/William M. DuBois House) is a historic house located in Fairfield, Iowa.

== Description and history ==
Built on the edge of town in about 1876 for W. C. and Mary Ball, the house is a transitional structure between the Italianate vernacular and that of the later Victorian picturesque styles. The 2½-story frame house features bracketed eaves, a full-height bay section on the south elevation, cornice returns, a high-pitched roof, facade gable, crenellations and finials on the ridges. A prominent feature of the house is its three porches: a kitchen porch on the west side, a dining room porch on the south, and a wrap-around porch on the southeast.

The house was listed on the National Register of Historic Places on April 4, 1985.
