= Fred and Rosa Fulton Barn =

- U.S. National Register of Historic Places
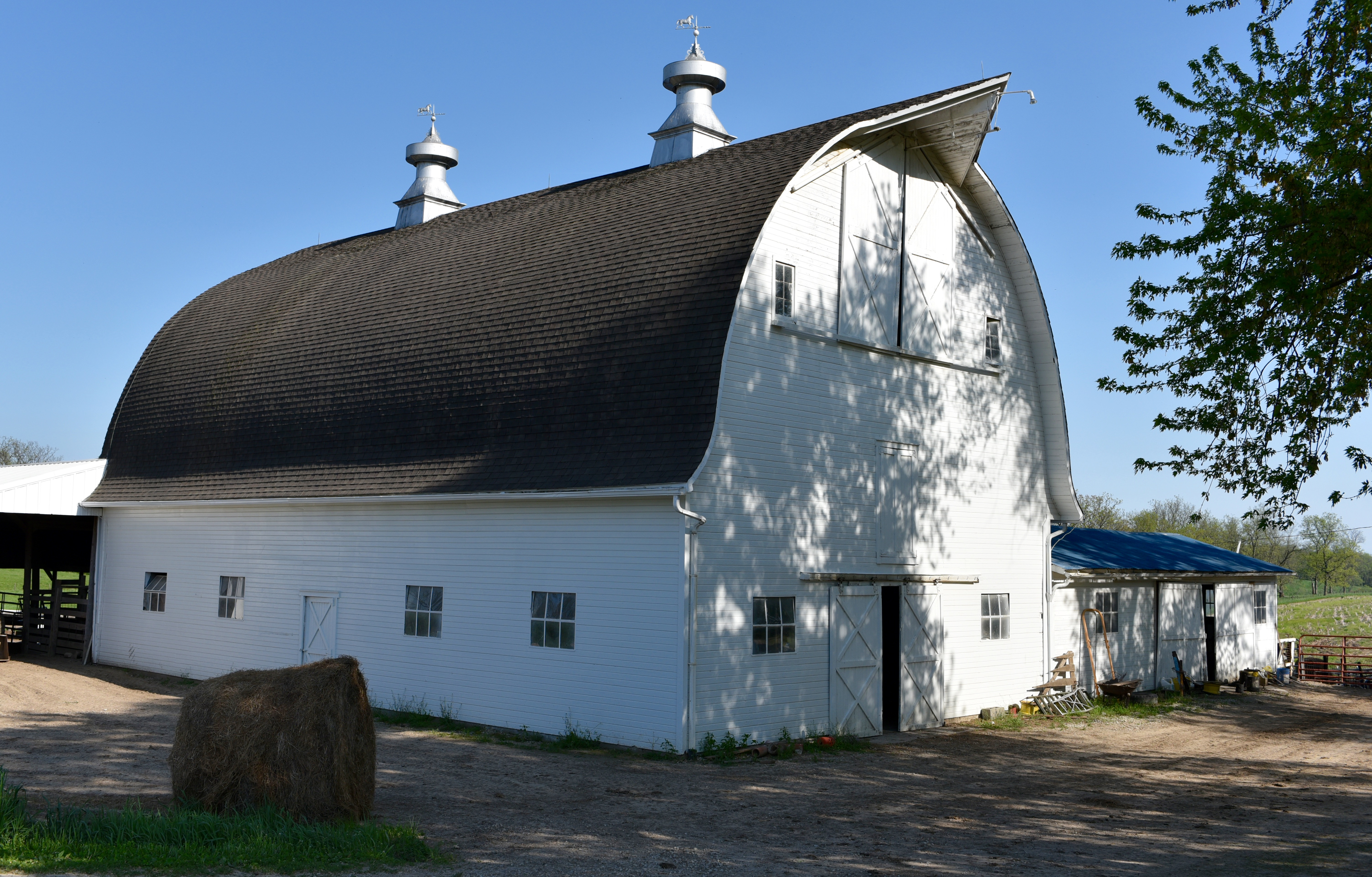

- Location within Iowa Location within the United States
- Location: 1210 278th Blvd.
- Nearest city: Selma, Iowa
- Coordinates: 40°54′04″N 92°08′18″W
- Area: less than one acre
- Built: 1947
- Architect: Louden Machinery Company
- MPS: Louden Machinery Company, Fairfield Iowa MPS
- NRHP reference No.: 99000119
- Added to NRHP: February 22, 1999

The Fred and Rosa Fulton Barn is a historic building located north of Selma, Iowa, United States in rural Jefferson County. The barn was built by Rosa from plans prepared by the Louden Machinery Company of Fairfield, Iowa. It is a good example of the company's Gothic laminated roof design. The barn also includes other Louden-manufactured devices, including "Master-Made" ventilator windows, metal roof aerators, hay carrier and fork, and door tracks and trolleys. This equipment is original to the barn's construction in 1947. Built for a dairy operation, the structure has subsequently been used for general farm purposes. The barn was listed on the National Register of Historic Places in 1999.

It sports a hay hood.
