= O.F. and Lulu E. Fryer House =

Historic house in Iowa, United States

- U.S. National Register of Historic Places
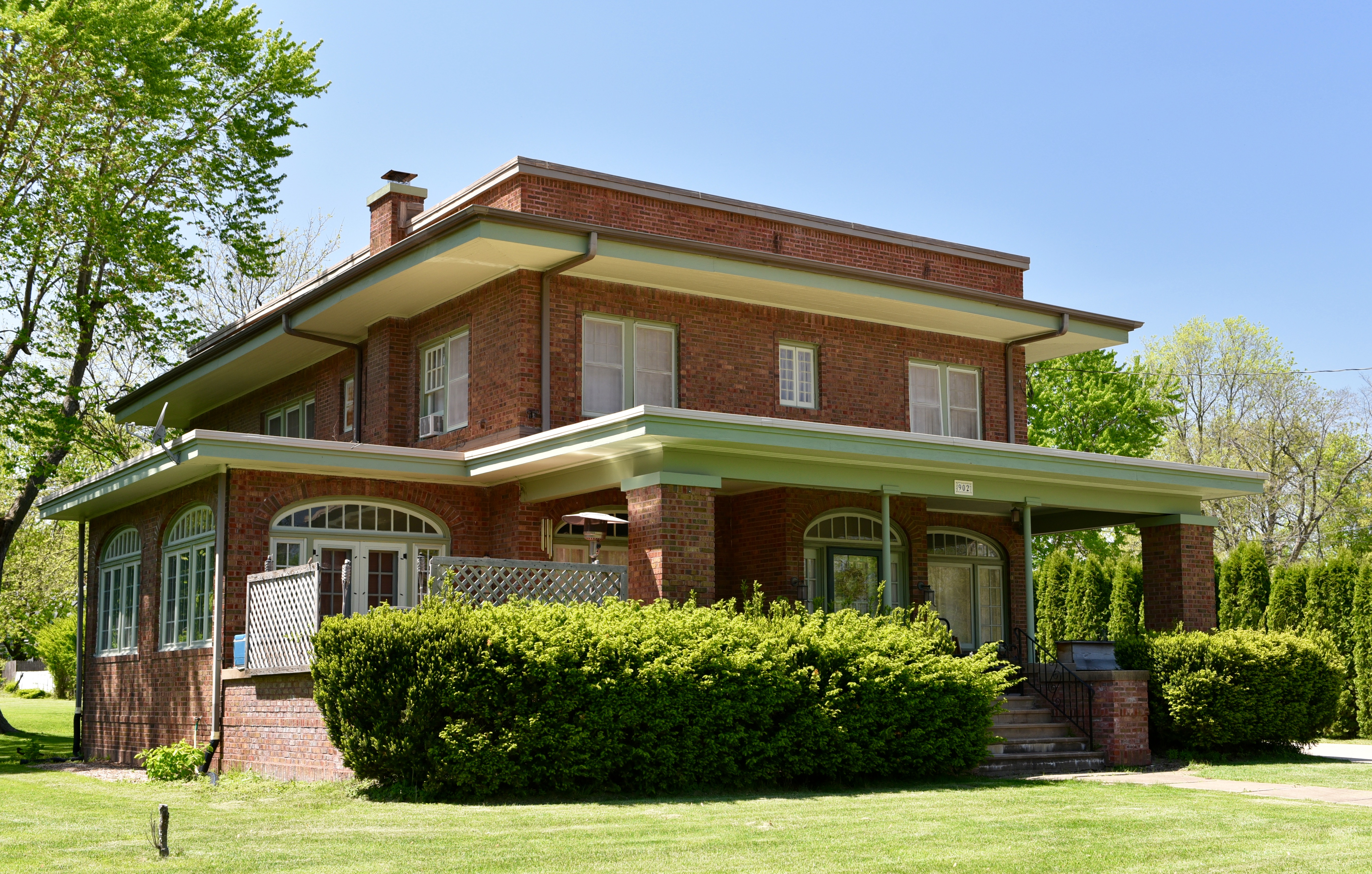

- Location within Iowa Location within the United States
- Location: 902 S. Main St. Fairfield, Iowa
- Coordinates: 40°59′55″N 91°57′51″W
- Area: less than one acre
- Built: 1920
- Architect: Guy A. Carpenter
- Architectural style: Prairie School
- NRHP reference No.: 99000131
- Added to NRHP: February 5, 1999

The O.F. and Lulu E. Fryer House is a historic residence located in Fairfield, Iowa, United States. Ode Franklin Fryer was a local banker. This Prairie School house was built for him and his wife Lulu in 1920. It was designed by Guy A. Carpenter, a local freelance architect. The historic designation includes the house and the detached garage. The two-story brick rectangular structure features a flat roof, a single-story solarium, a full-width porch, and a porte cochere. A prominent feature of the house is its wide eaves. The house was listed on the National Register of Historic Places in 1999.
