= Gobble and Heer–Spurgeons Building =

- U.S. National Register of Historic Places
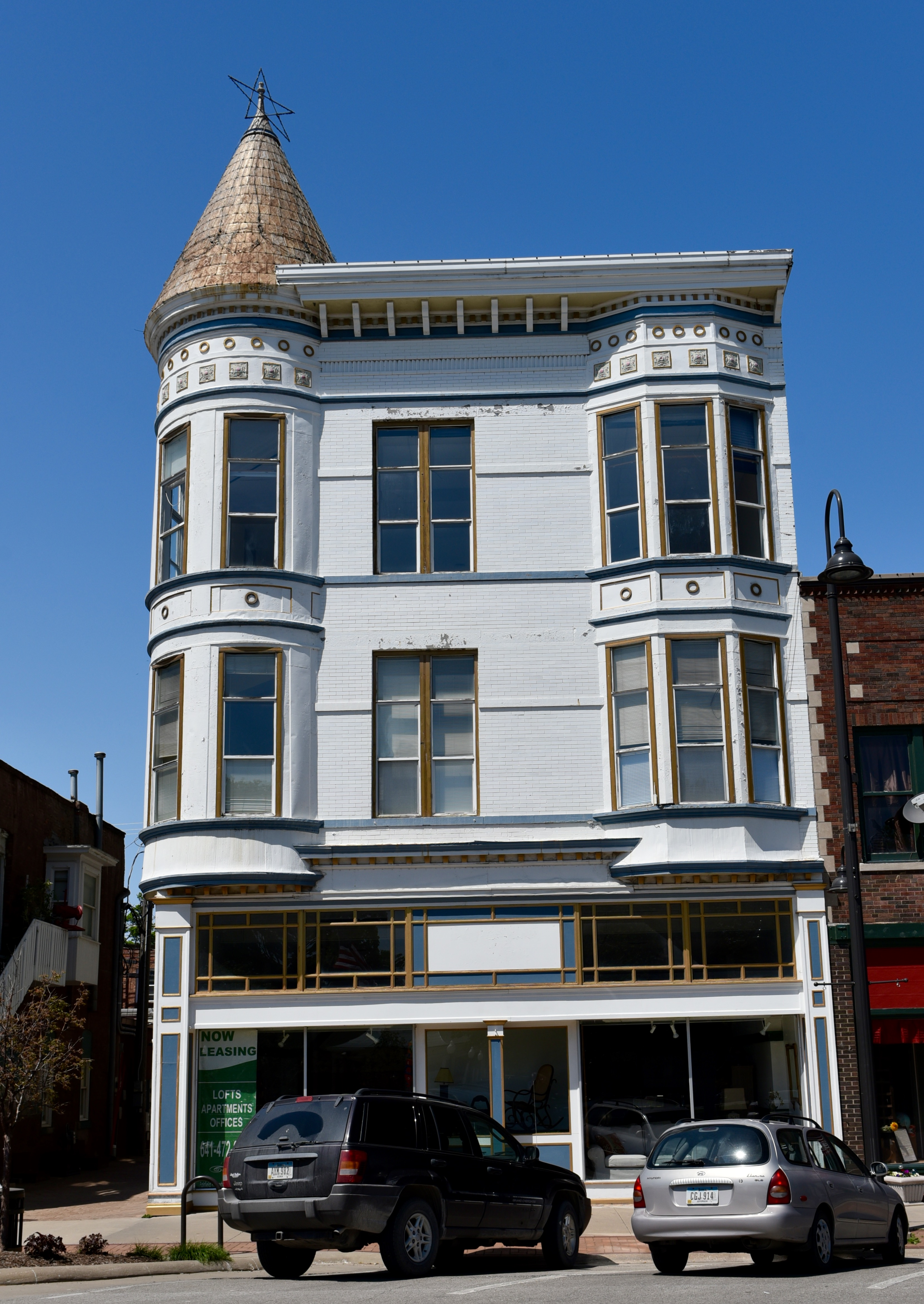

- Location within Iowa Location within the United States
- Location: 51 E. Broadway; Fairfield, Iowa
- Coordinates: 41°0′28″N 91°57′46″W
- Area: less than one acre
- Built: 1892
- Architectural style: Queen Anne
- NRHP reference No.: 15000727
- Added to NRHP: October 13, 2015

The Gobble and Heer–Spurgeons Building is a historic building located in Fairfield, Iowa, United States. It housed two long-time businesses and its significance highlights the commercial development of the city's public square. The building is a three-story, brick, Queen Anne commercial building that was built by Ed Hunt and E. A. Howard on the north side of the town square in 1892. They did not occupy the building themselves, but rented to Harry Booker for his clothing store and the Bevering Cigar Store. Lee T. Gobble and Charles H. Heer bought the clothing store from the Booker estate in 1899. Both the clothing store and the cigar store remained in the building until the 1930s when the entire first floor was taken over by Spurgeons. The upper floors were a mix of offices, apartments, and a lodge hall for the Knights of Pythias and the Pythian Sisters on the third floor. The building was listed on the National Register of Historic Places in 2015.
