= Wilson Building (Fairfield, Iowa) =

- U.S. National Register of Historic Places
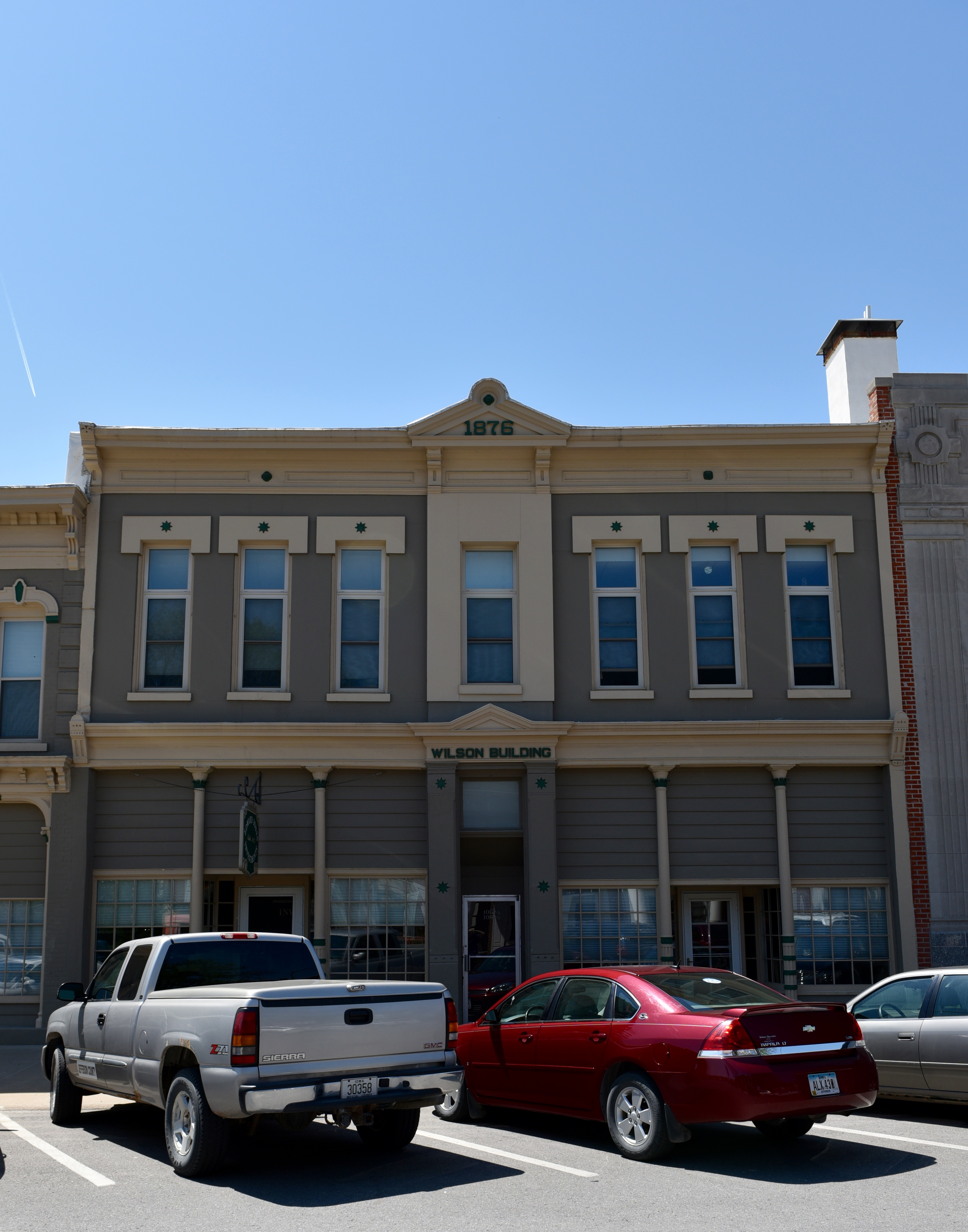

- Location within Iowa Location within the United States
- Location: 600-608 N. 9th St. Fairfield, Iowa
- Coordinates: 41°0′22″N 91°57′45″W
- Area: less than one acre
- Built: 1876
- Architectural style: Italianate
- MPS: US Senator James F. Wilson Historic Resources MPS
- NRHP reference No.: 90002129
- Added to NRHP: January 24, 1991

The Wilson Building, also known as the Wilson Block, is a historic building located in Fairfield, Iowa, United States. The two-story Italianate commercial building was built in 1876 by James F. Wilson as an investment property. In 1865 Wilson helped establish and served as president of the First National Bank in Fairfield, and in 1870, he and R. H. Hufford, C. W. Slagle, and George Acheson organized the Jefferson County Coal Company. Wilson had been a three-term Republican Congressman representing Iowa's 1st congressional district. Seven years after this building was constructed he began the first of two terms in the United States Senate. He had a Senate office in this building from 1883 to 1895. The historic significance of this building reflects the importance of Wilson's contributions to the economic life of Fairfield, and his political career. The building was listed on the National Register of Historic Places in 1991.
