= Louden Machinery Company =

American engineering, manufacturing and design company

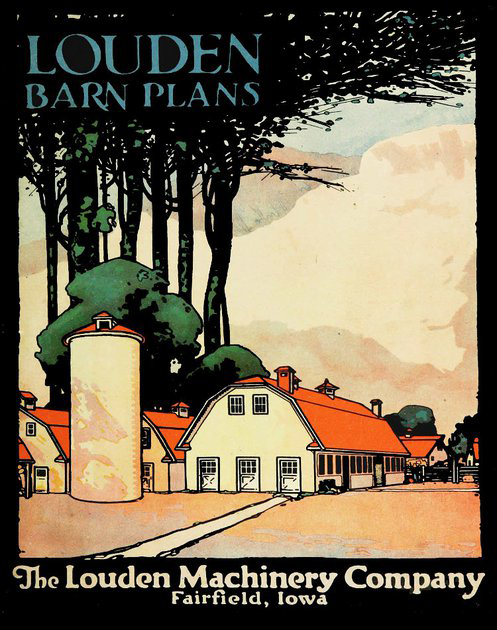
1920 Louden Barn Plans Catalog

The Louden Machinery Company was an American engineering, manufacturing and design company based in Fairfield, Iowa. Founded by William Louden, the company in its early years manufactured and sold the patented hay carrier that he invented in 1867. The company later expanded into a wide variety of farm equipment and, in 1906, began an Architecture Department that reportedly designed more than 25,000 barns from 1906 to 1939. During World War I, Louden's monorail equipment carrier began to be applied to industrial and military applications. By the 1920s, much of the company's revenues were derived from industrial applications of its monorail equipment carriers. Several sites associated with the company have been listed on the National Register of Historic Places. These sites include the company's 1892 manufacturing facility in downtown Fairfield, several homes in and around Fairfield, and a number of barns in Iowa, Ohio and Michigan that were designed by the company's Architecture Department.

== Company history ==
=== Founding and early years ===
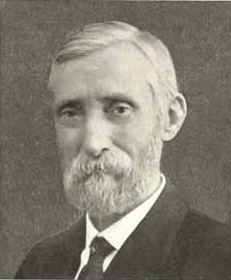
William Louden, 1915

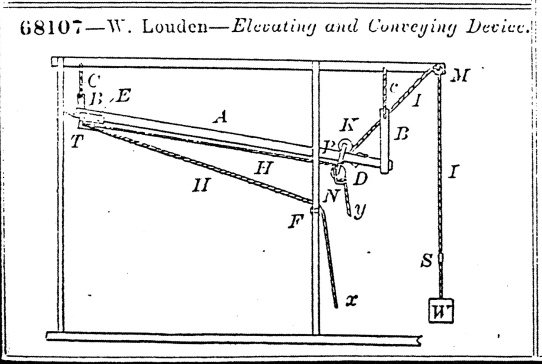
William Louden's 1867 patent for a hay carrier

The company was founded by William Louden (1841–1931). Louden was born in Pennsylvania and moved to Iowa as an infant. After attending Axline University in Fairfield, he became a teacher. In 1867, he invented a patented hay carrier that made two-story barns practical. According to one description, Louden's hay carrier "utilized the already existing hay fork tool but broadened its use by attaching it to an overhead monorail along which the hay fork and hay could be moved within a barn."

In 1868, he opened his first shop to manufacture his hay carriers. In 1868, Louden moved his manufacturing operation to Fairfield where it operated under the name Louden Manufacturing Works. Despite setbacks resulting in his bankruptcy during the Long Depression of the 1870s, he continued manufacturing hay carriers through the 1880s. In 1887, William Louden and his wife Mary Jane formed Louden Machinery Company. Younger brother Robert B. "R.B." Louden (1857-1939) joined the company in 1889 and became the company's president when it incorporated in 1892. In the early 1890s, the company opened a factory in downtown Fairfield (at 607 West Broadway) that is still in existence and has been listed on the National Register of Historic Places.

=== Expansion ===
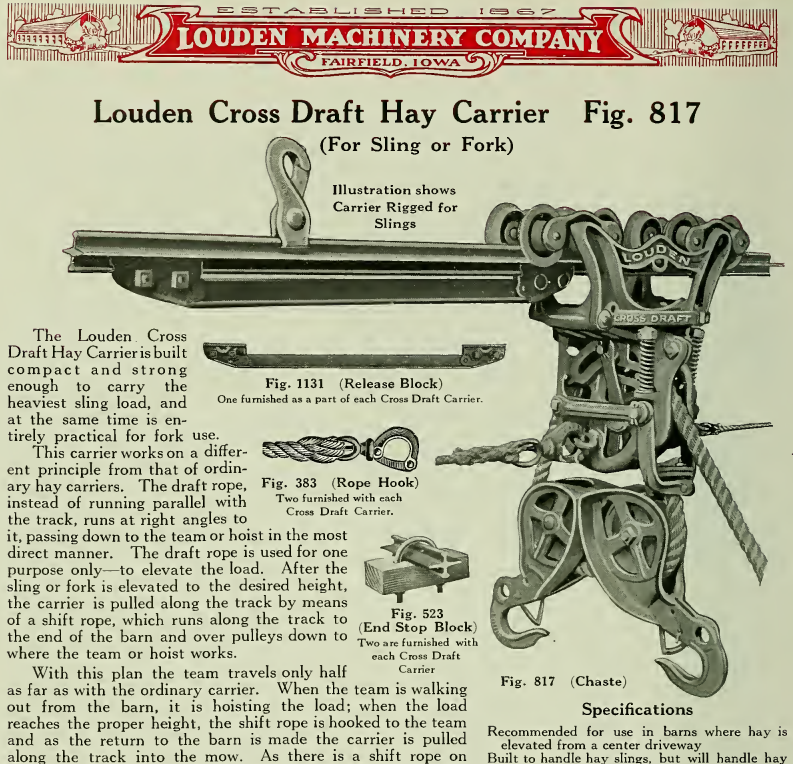
Louden Cross Draft Hay Carrier (1915)

The company expanded in the 1890s and 1900s, with R.B. handling the business side, William being left free to invent new products. William added to the company's product line with his inventions of a flexible barn door hanger (1895), barn litter carriers and tracks (1898), all-steel cow stalls (1907), individual automatic watering bowls for cows (1912), an Easy Feeding Hog Trough (1914), and an industrial line of Overhead Carrying Equipment (1917). Albert H. Neller, who has been described as William Louden's "right-hand-man," is also credited with developing a number of products, including the automatic watering bowls, and with being a key to the company's success during the 1910s and 1920s. The company also expanded geographically opening branches in Canada (1900), Minneapolis (1903), Albany, New York (1912), and Chicago (1915). By 1915, the factory in Fairfield employed 100 men, and the company operated another large factory in Guelph, Ontario. By 1920, Louden Machinery Company had sales of $2.5 million.

The company continued to expand its product line in the 1920s and 1930s, adding a wide array of products, including barn cupolas, exhaust and intake hoods and louvers, fans, valves, pulleys, power hoists, concrete mangers, a patented garage door hanger (using overhead door tracks for ease in opening and closing), playground equipment (including slides, see-saws, gym sets, "swing bobs," and "whirl-arounds"), and thermostats.

=== Architecture Department ===
In 1906, the company established an Architectural Department, sometimes referred to as the Louden Planning Service or the Barn Plan Department, began offering free "barn planning service." The company's architects designed barns "to promote more efficient use of space and labor saving devices," including the use of Louden equipment. The Architecture Department's projects include Homewood Farms for the president of Deere & Co., as well as several barns that have been listed on the National Register of Historic Places. The Architecture Department also designed specialized dairy barns, horse stables, hog and chicken houses, and farmstead sites. The company reported that it had planned more than 25,000 barns by 1939. The department also published a catalog of barn plans, including round barns, that was published in multiple editions in the first half of the 20th century. Architects employed by the Louden Architecture Department include Edward C. Peterkie (1879-1940), Guy A. Carpenter, C. Eugene Fleming, The Architecture Department ceased operations in approximately 1947.

=== Industrial applications for Louden Monorail ===
During World War I, Louden's monorail litter carrier was adapted to industrial uses, including the manufacture of ammunition. By the 1920s, the company earned much of its revenue from industrial applications of Louden Monorail to carry equipment in factories of companies such as Allis-Chalmers and General Motors. The company also established a Louden Engineers division to design custom adaptations of Louden Monorail in a variety of contexts, including factories, foundries, industrial dipping machines, clothing handling, bales of cotton, motion picture lighting.

During World War II, the company reached record production levels, fueled by demand for the company's overhead handling equipment, including the improved Louden "Super Track" monorail systems. Military applications of Louden Monorail included its application for material handling devices used in the manufacture of uranium for the first atomic bomb at Oak Ridge, Tennessee, and for material handling in a B-29 bomber plant in Marietta, Georgia.

"Super Track" systems were also used by the Rocket Express Company to construct department store monorail rides for children during the mid-20th century.

=== Later years ===
William Louden died in 1931, and Robert B. Louden followed in 1939. William's son, Robert Bruce Louden, took over as the company's president following the death of Robert B. Louden and continued to hold that position until his death in 1952. Arthur Clare Louden, another son of William, served as the company's president from 1952 to 1953.

In 1956, the company was purchased by Mechanical Handling Systems, Inc., of Detroit, Michigan. William's grandson, William L. Fry, served as the firm's president general manager from 1956 to 1963. In 1965, Louden's line of farm equipment was discontinued. Louden's overhead handling equipment continued to operate and became the Crane & Monorail Systems Division of American Chain and Cable Company (ACCO). Acco-Louden continues to manufacture overhead monorail conveying equipment.

== Historic sites ==
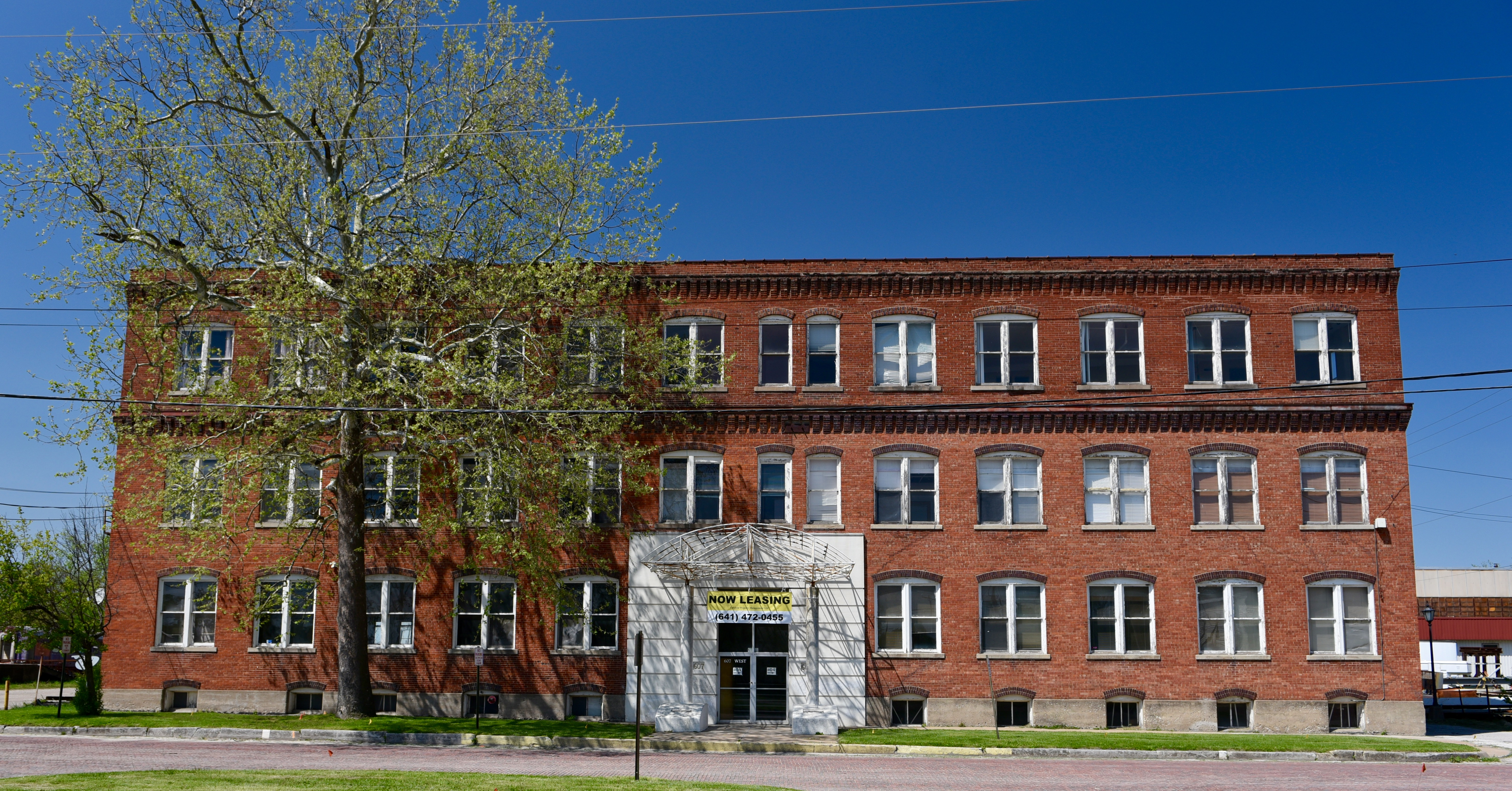
Louden Machinery Company (Broadway Building)

A number of buildings and structures attributed to, or associated with, the company and the Louden family are listed on the National Register of Historic Places.

=== Attributed to Louden Machinery Company ===
Sites attributed in whole or in part to the Louden Machinery Company include:

- Fred and Rosa Fulton Barn, 1210 278th Blvd., Selma, Iowa (Louden Machinery Company), NRHP-listed
- Granot Loma, County Road 550 on the Lake Superior shore north of Thoneys Pt., Powell Township, Marquette, Michigan, NRHP-listed
  The Loma Farms complex, the farm component of a large estate, was constructed in 1927 by the Hoeppner-Bartlett Company of Eau Claire, Wisconsin, using a number of designs provided by the Louden Machinery Company.
- Louden Machinery Company, also known as the Broadway Building, 607 W. Broadway Ave., Fairfield, Iowa (Louden Machinery Company), NRHP-listed
- Louden Monorail System in the Auto Repair Shop, 117 E. Broadway Ave., Fairfield, Iowa
- Louden Whirl-Around (1925), Fairfield Golf & County Club Grounds, 905 E. Harrison Ave., Fairfield, Iowa ("whirl-around" playground equipment designed by Louden Machinery Company located on the grounds of country club), NRHP-listed
- R. B. and Lizzie L. Louden House (1871), 107 W. Washington Ave., Fairfield, Iowa (Louden Machinery Company), NRHP-listed
- R.R. and Antoinette Louden House (1925), 905 E. Adams Ave., Fairfield, Iowa (designed by C. Eugene Fleming of the Louden Architecture Department)
- August and Vera Luedtke Barn, sometimes the Fred and Vera Luedtke Barn, 1938 185th St., vicinity of Fairfield, Iowa (Architectural Department of the Louden Machinery Company)
- McCafferty Run Farmstead, 17114 and 17226 OH 104, Chillicothe, Ohio (dairy barn north of the house attributed as a design of Louden Machinery Company), NRHP-listed
- Midway Stock Farm Barn, north of Keosauqua, Iowa; litter carrier, hay carrier, and a metal aerator added to a c. 1880 barn
- Hancock Shaker Village, Pittsfield, MA, National Historic Landmark; Dairy ell, Louden plan, added to 1910 barn complex in 1939.

=== Affiliated properties ===
- Arthur C. and Maud Louden House, 201 S. Highland St., Fairfield, Iowa
- R. Bruce and May W. Louden House, 501 W. Adams Ave., Fairfield, Iowa, NRHP-listed
- William and Mary Jane Louden House (1897), 501 W. Washington Ave., Fairfield, Iowa, NRHP-listed (home of company founder William Louden and his wife Mary Jane)
