= Empower Playgrounds =

US company that designs playground systems

Empower Playgrounds Inc.
- Formation: March 2007
- Type: Nonprofit Organization
- Headquarters: Provo, Utah
- Location: United States, Ghana
- Official language: English
- Key people: Ben Markham (founder, president)
- Website: empowerplaygrounds.org

Empower Playgrounds, Inc. is a U.S.-based 501(c)(3) public charity that has developed electricity-generating playground equipment for use in rural third-world communities with low rates of rural electrification. The charity works in predominantly subsistence agriculture communities, where children often work on family farms until sundown, and schools and homes are not equipped with electricity, making it difficult for children to do homework or develop study habits.

== History ==
EPI was founded in 2007 by retired chemical engineer and vice-president of engineering at ExxonMobil Research and Engineering, Ben Markham. While living in Ghana, Markham had observed the darkness of rural homes and school classrooms, and a scarcity of play equipment in schoolyards.

With help from Brigham Young University, playground equipment that generates electricity from children's play was created. The concept was field-tested and improved in Ghana in 2008. Kweku Anno converted the design to use locally available materials. After school selection involving EPI social scientists and the Ghanaian Ministry of Education, Anno Engineering manufactured and installed the systems.

Initially, EPI hand-modified LED camping lanterns so they could be recharged by the EPI system. In 2009, Energizer became a sponsor for EPI, donating development of LED lanterns specifically designed for the EPI service. The lantern has a computer chip that manages the charging of the custom battery pack and the operation of the LED lights, which provides lighting equivalent to a 25-watt incandescent light bulb for over 40 hours per charge. The lights have an expected service life greater than five years. In 2009–2010, EPI began including science kits with its playground equipment.

As of June 2015, EPI power-generating play equipment was installed at 42 rural schools.

== Products and services ==
Children at recess in Ghana on Playworld Systems Inc. MGR.

The EPI system currently includes a power generating merry-go-round attached to a generation train with a hub bearing. A drive shaft from the hub connects to a helical gearbox, which turns a shaft, which then turns a magnet windmill generator. The electricity generated by the merry-go-round and all other play equipment in the EPI system is converted to direct current and used to charge a battery. A thirty-watt solar panel is also connect to the power enclosure to prevent battery discharging during school breaks. The panel provides about 20% of the total system energy when school is in session.

Children in Ghana study with EPI lanterns.

=== Education ===
Without much access to government-provided electricity or school supplies, the teaching of science within rural villages is often abstract or theoretical. This makes it difficult for children to learn basic concepts as foundations of further learning.

In 2009, an EPI intern traveled to Ghana for three months to meet with the Ghanaian Ministry of Education, elementary education developers, and the students and teachers of rural villages to assess which needs were not being met. It was decided that EPI playground equipment could work for teaching general mechanics, physics, energy transfer, and other basic principles of science for instance demonstrating the conversion of power to electricity.

In the spring of 2010, two more interns from EPI traveled to Ghana to test the science kits and train teachers to use them. The average cost of an EPI system, which includes school selection, manufacturing costs, shipping fees, science lab, teacher training, and installation, is $10,000.

In mid-2010, EPI began a scholarship program for promising young children who attend EPI-sponsored rural schools, and who have benefited from the EPI equipment. With the help of this scholarship, one student from rural Ghana is now attending high school, an opportunity not available otherwise.

== Additional sources ==
- BYU Full Video documentary
- Daily Herald article 7 January 2010
- Deseret News video/article, 19 June 2008
- BYU Mechanical Engineering Capstone Project Page
