= Salina, Iowa =

Unincorporated community in Iowa, United States

- unincorporated community
- Location within Iowa
- Coordinates: 41°2′45″N 91°49′59″W
- Country: United States
- State: Iowa
- County: Jefferson
- Elevation: 755 ft (230 m)
- Time zone: UTC-6 (Central (CST))
  - Summer (DST): UTC-5 (CDT)
- GNIS feature ID: 461377

Salina is a small rural unincorporated community and populated place that is located in both Buchanan and Lockridge townships in Jefferson County, Iowa, United States.

== Geography ==
Salina lies at the junction of 180th Street and Spruce Road.

== History ==
The town of Salina was platted in April 1852 by Thomas Allinder and John Hoaglien in Sections 12 and 13 of Buchanan Township and Sections 7 and 18 of Lockridge Township.

Prominent early-twentieth-century Nebraska political figure George C. Junkin was born in Salina in 1858. The population was 60 in 1940.

== See also ==
- Pekin, Iowa
