= Beckwith, Iowa =

- Unincorporated community
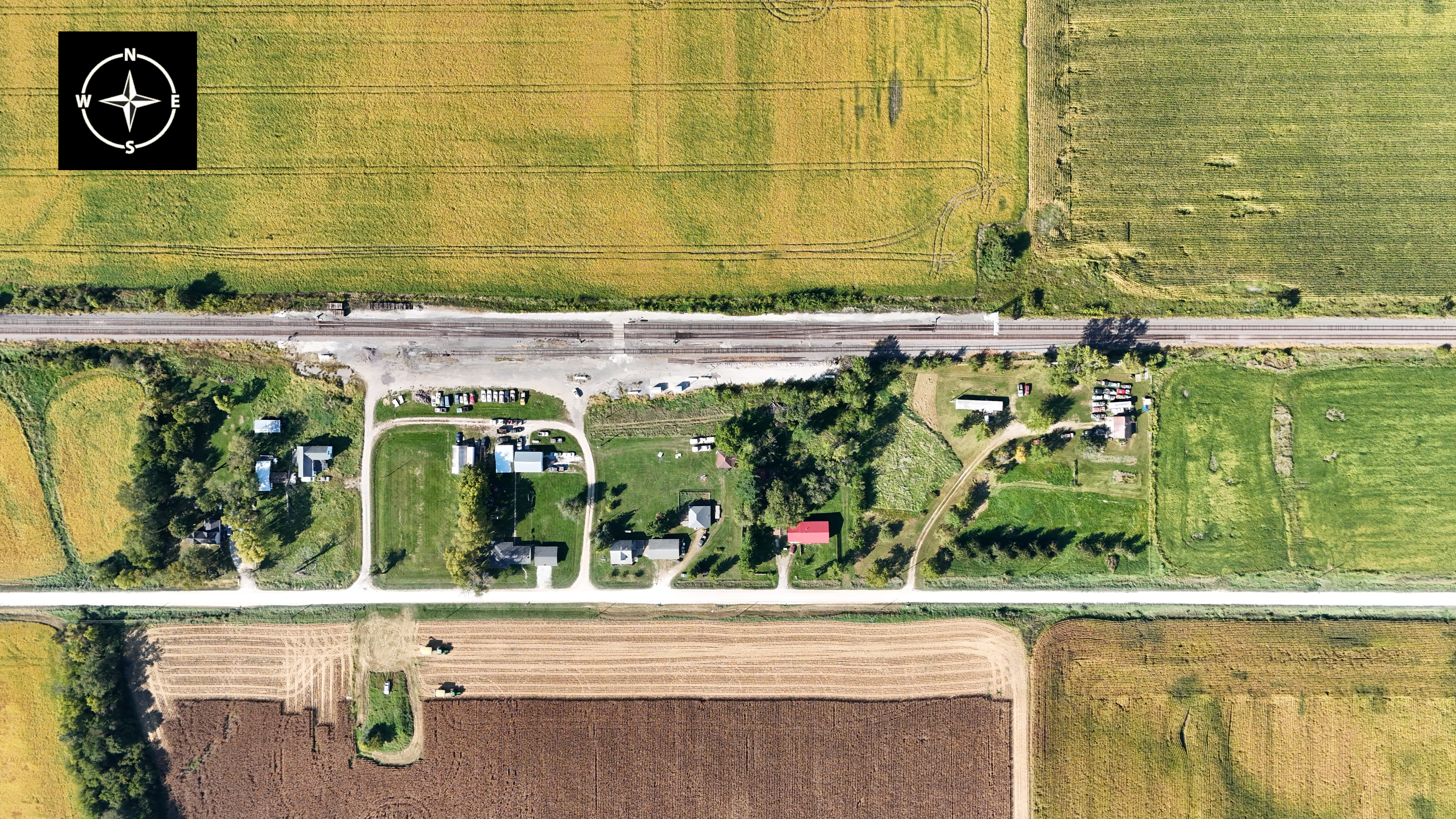
- An aerial photo of Beckwith

- Location within Iowa
- Coordinates: 41°00′33″N 91°51′32″W
- Country: United States
- State: Iowa
- Time zone: UTC-6 (Central (CST))
  - Summer (DST): UTC-5 (CDT)
- Area code: 712
- GNIS feature ID: 464457

Beckwith is an unincorporated community in Jefferson County, in the U.S. state of Iowa.

== Geography ==
Beckwith is in Jefferson County, about 5 miles (8.0 km) from the county seat, Fairfield.

== History ==
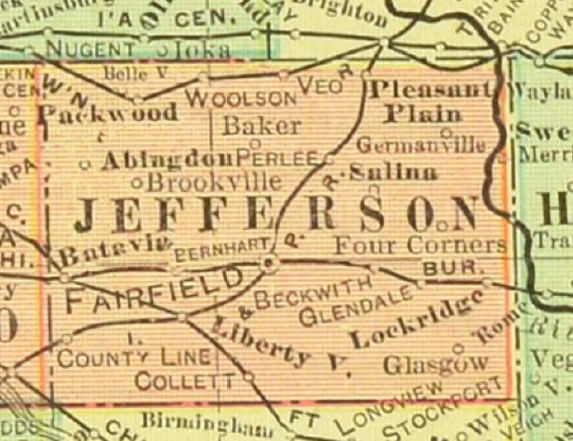
Beckwith in Jefferson County, Iowa, in 1902

Beckwith was founded on the Chicago, Burlington & Quincy Railroad (CB&Q). Beckwith's post office operated from 1877 to 1901.

Beckwith School began in 1851. The original building was likely a log building, but probably in the early 1860s the school was moved. This was a one-room schoolhouse. The Beckwith School District #5 celebrated its 100th anniversary in 1951.

The community's population was 50 in 1890, 65 in 1900, 50 in 1920, and 32 in 1940.

For fifty years, starting in 1889, Beckwith had a column in the Fairfield Ledger called "Beckwith Briefs". The items were written by Beckwith resident and Ledger correspondent Jennie Prince, who had to convince Ledger editor W.W. Junkin that women could write news stories. Originally written every other week, the stories were eventually published nearly every day by the 1930s, as the Ledger gradually became a daily paper. Jennie Prince enjoyed a friendly rivalry with the correspondent for nearby Glendale's news column in the Ledger, called the "Glendale Gleanings".

Beckwith lies on an Amtrak line, and in 2018 was one of four Iowa sites selected for an upgrade to a centralized traffic control crossover, as part of a federal grant.

== See also ==
- Veo, Iowa
