= Polk Township, Iowa =

Polk Township, Iowa may refer to one of the following places:

- Polk Township, Benton County, Iowa
- Polk Township, Bremer County, Iowa
- Polk Township, Jefferson County, Iowa
- Polk Township, Shelby County, Iowa
- Polk Township, Taylor County, Iowa
- Polk Township, Wapello County, Iowa

See also

- Polk Township (disambiguation)
