= Round Prairie Township =

Round Prairie Township may refer to the following townships in the United States:

- Round Prairie Township, Jefferson County, Iowa
- Round Prairie Township, Todd County, Minnesota
- Round Prairie Township, Callaway County, Missouri
