= Lockridge, Iowa =

- City
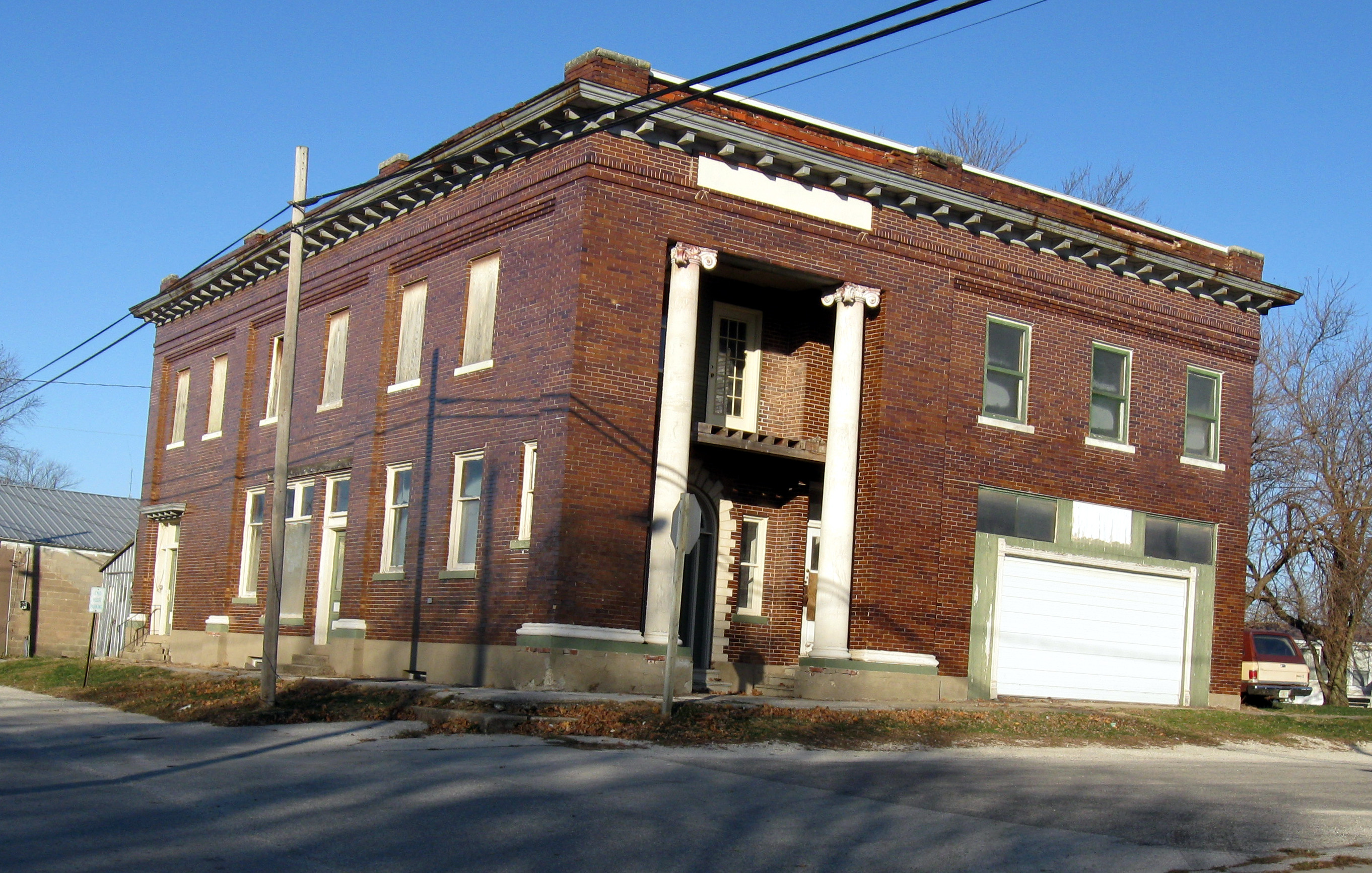
- Lockridge, Iowa

- Location of Lockridge, Iowa
- Coordinates: 40°59′36″N 91°45′02″W
- Country: United States
- State: Iowa
- County: Jefferson

Area
  - Total: 0.63 sq mi (1.62 km^{2})
  - Land: 0.63 sq mi (1.62 km^{2})
  - Water: 0 sq mi (0.00 km^{2})
- Elevation: 725 ft (221 m)

Population (2020)
  - Total: 244
  - Density: 390.8/sq mi (150.89/km^{2})
- Time zone: UTC-6 (Central (CST))
  - Summer (DST): UTC-5 (CDT)
- ZIP code: 52635
- Area code: 319
- FIPS code: 19-46065
- GNIS feature ID: 2395741

Lockridge is a city in Jefferson County, Iowa, United States. The population was 244 at the time of the 2020 census. Lockridge was one of the communities considered for the county seat in 1839, but lost out to Fairfield.

== Geography ==
According to the United States Census Bureau, the city has a total area of 0.74 square miles (1.92 km^{2}), all land.

== Demographics ==
Historical populations
Year	Pop.	±%
1880	49	—
1920	230	+369.4%
1930	231	+0.4%
1940	279	+20.8%
1950	233	−16.5%
1960	206	−11.6%
1970	232	+12.6%
1980	271	+16.8%
1990	270	−0.4%
2000	275	+1.9%
2010	268	−2.5%
2020	244	−9.0%
Source:"U.S. Census website". United States Census Bureau. and Iowa Data Center; Source: U.S. Decennial Census

The estimated median house or condo value in 2009 was $49,488, increasing from 2000 when it was $30,000.

=== 2020 census ===
As of the census of 2020, there were 244 people, 106 households, and 72 families residing in the city. The population density was 390.8 inhabitants per square mile (150.9/km^{2}). There were 110 housing units at an average density of 176.2 per square mile (68.0/km^{2}). The racial makeup of the city was 91.8% White, 0.4% Black or African American, 0.8% Native American, 0.0% Asian, 0.0% Pacific Islander, 2.5% from other races and 4.5% from two or more races. Hispanic or Latino persons of any race comprised 4.1% of the population.

Of the 106 households, 25.5% of which had children under the age of 18 living with them, 47.2% were married couples living together, 7.5% were cohabitating couples, 25.5% had a female householder with no spouse or partner present and 19.8% had a male householder with no spouse or partner present. 32.1% of all households were non-families. 25.5% of all households were made up of individuals, 11.3% had someone living alone who was 65 years old or older.

The median age in the city was 49.2 years. 23.0% of the residents were under the age of 20; 3.7% were between the ages of 20 and 24; 19.3% were from 25 and 44; 31.1% were from 45 and 64; and 23.0% were 65 years of age or older. The gender makeup of the city was 50.4% male and 49.6% female.

=== 2010 census ===
As of the census of 2010, there were 268 people, 107 households, and 77 families living in the city. The population density was 362.2 inhabitants per square mile (139.8/km^{2}). There were 123 housing units at an average density of 166.2 per square mile (64.2/km^{2}). The racial makeup of the city was 96.6% White and 3.4% from other races. Hispanic or Latino of any race were 4.5% of the population.

There were 107 households, of which 33.6% had children under the age of 18 living with them, 51.4% were married couples living together, 11.2% had a female householder with no husband present, 9.3% had a male householder with no wife present, and 28.0% were non-families. 21.5% of all households were made up of individuals, and 5.6% had someone living alone who was 65 years of age or older. The average household size was 2.50 and the average family size was 2.92.

The median age in the city was 39 years. 26.1% of residents were under the age of 18; 7.8% were between the ages of 18 and 24; 22.8% were from 25 to 44; 33.2% were from 45 to 64; and 10.1% were 65 years of age or older. The gender makeup of the city was 52.2% male and 47.8% female.

=== 2000 census ===
As of the census of 2000, there were 275 people, 103 households, and 73 families living in the city. The population density was 376.8 inhabitants per square mile (145.5/km^{2}). There were 109 housing units at an average density of 149.3 per square mile (57.6/km^{2}). The racial makeup of the city was 100.00% White. Hispanic or Latino of any race were 1.09% of the population.

There were 103 households, out of which 33.0% had children under the age of 18 living with them, 55.3% were married couples living together, 12.6% had a female householder with no husband present, and 29.1% were non-families. 22.3% of all households were made up of individuals, and 5.8% had someone living alone who was 65 years of age or older. The average household size was 2.67 and the average family size was 3.11.

In the city, the population was spread out, with 31.3% under the age of 18, 8.4% from 18 to 24, 29.5% from 25 to 44, 22.9% from 45 to 64, and 8.0% who were 65 years of age or older. The median age was 32 years. For every 100 females, there were 100.7 males. For every 100 females age 18 and over, there were 96.9 males.

The median income for a household in the city was $31,250, and the median income for a family was $38,750. Males had a median income of $30,000 versus $22,679 for females. The per capita income for the city was $14,347. About 5.5% of families and 9.6% of the population were below the poverty line, including 7.6% of those under the age of eighteen and 23.1% of those 65 or over.
