= Pleasant Plain, Iowa =

- City
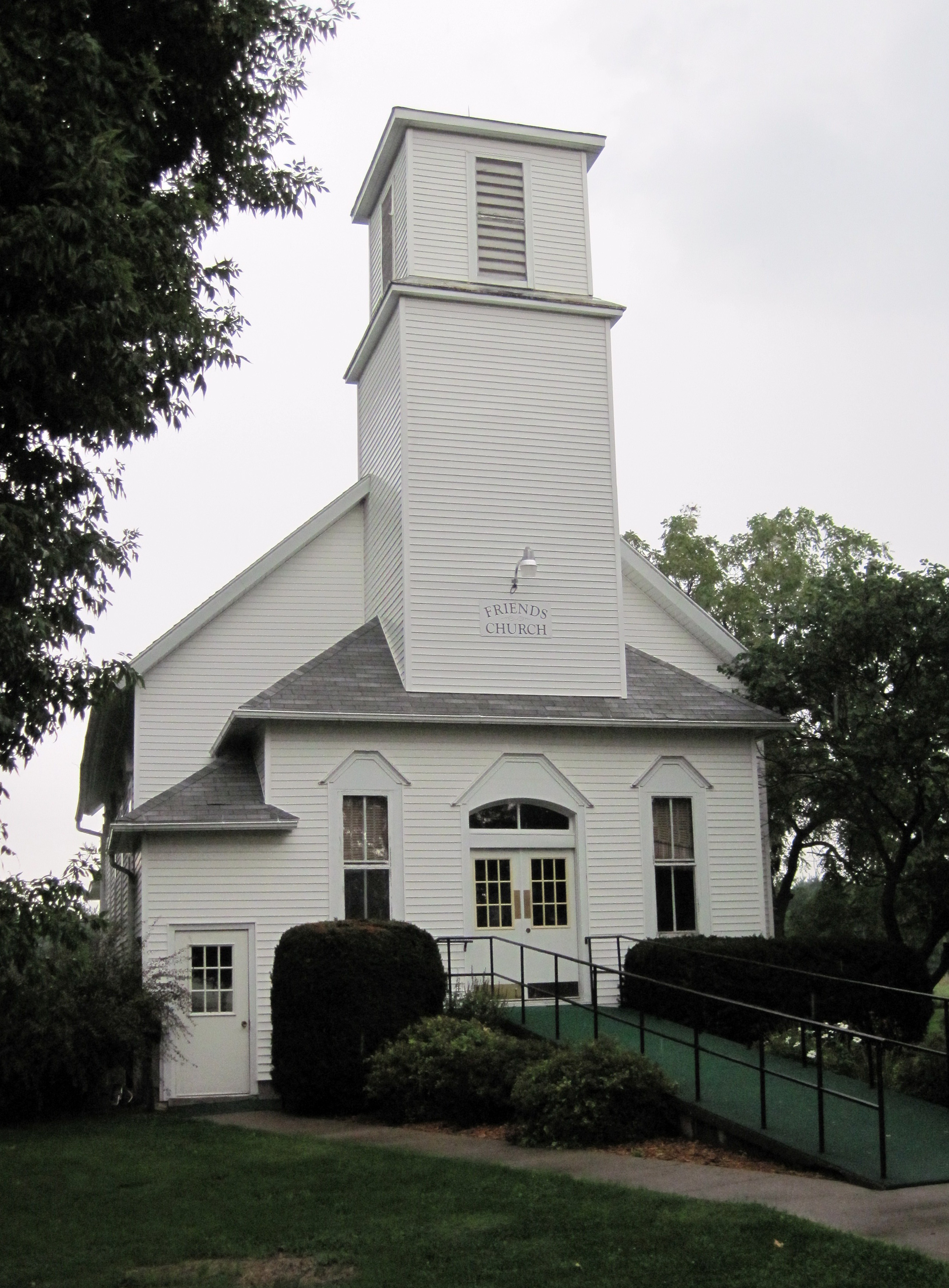
- Friends Church

- Location of Pleasant Plain, Iowa
- Coordinates: 41°08′50″N 91°51′35″W
- Country: United States
- State: Iowa
- County: Jefferson

Area
  - Total: 1.01 sq mi (2.62 km^{2})
  - Land: 1.01 sq mi (2.62 km^{2})
  - Water: 0 sq mi (0.00 km^{2})
- Elevation: 755 ft (230 m)

Population (2020)
  - Total: 84
  - Density: 82.9/sq mi (32.02/km^{2})
- Time zone: UTC-6 (Central (CST))
  - Summer (DST): UTC-5 (CDT)
- ZIP code: 52540
- Area code: 319
- FIPS code: 19-63615
- GNIS feature ID: 2396233

Pleasant Plain is a city in northeast Penn Township, Jefferson County, Iowa, United States. At the time of the 2020 census, the population was 84.

== Geography ==
According to the United States Census Bureau, the city has a total area of 1.02 square miles (2.64 km^{2}), all land.

== Demographics ==
Historical populations
Year	Pop.	±%
1900	280	—
1910	174	−37.9%
1920	164	−5.7%
1930	175	+6.7%
1940	171	−2.3%
1950	148	−13.5%
1960	147	−0.7%
1970	121	−17.7%
1980	144	+19.0%
1990	128	−11.1%
2000	131	+2.3%
2010	93	−29.0%
2020	84	−9.7%
Source:"U.S. Census website". United States Census Bureau. and Iowa Data Center; Source: U.S. Decennial Census

=== 2020 census ===
As of the census of 2020, there were 84 people, 38 households, and 26 families residing in the city. The population density was 82.9 inhabitants per square mile (32.0/km^{2}). There were 42 housing units at an average density of 41.5 per square mile (16.0/km^{2}). The racial makeup of the city was 89.3% White, 1.2% Black or African American, 0.0% Native American, 0.0% Asian, 0.0% Pacific Islander, 6.0% from other races and 3.6% from two or more races. Hispanic or Latino persons of any race comprised 2.4% of the population.

Of the 38 households, 34.2% of which had children under the age of 18 living with them, 50.0% were married couples living together, 13.2% were cohabitating couples, 23.7% had a female householder with no spouse or partner present and 13.2% had a male householder with no spouse or partner present. 31.6% of all households were non-families. 26.3% of all households were made up of individuals, 10.5% had someone living alone who was 65 years old or older.

The median age in the city was 46.5 years. 21.4% of the residents were under the age of 20; 3.6% were between the ages of 20 and 24; 22.6% were from 25 and 44; 27.4% were from 45 and 64; and 25.0% were 65 years of age or older. The gender makeup of the city was 56.0% male and 44.0% female.

=== 2010 census ===
As of the census of 2010, there were 93 people, 41 households, and 31 families living in the city. The population density was 91.2 inhabitants per square mile (35.2/km^{2}). There were 47 housing units at an average density of 46.1 per square mile (17.8/km^{2}). The racial makeup of the city was 100.0% White. Hispanic or Latino of any race were 1.1% of the population.

There were 41 households, of which 26.8% had children under the age of 18 living with them, 65.9% were married couples living together, 4.9% had a female householder with no husband present, 4.9% had a male householder with no wife present, and 24.4% were non-families. 24.4% of all households were made up of individuals, and 19.5% had someone living alone who was 65 years of age or older. The average household size was 2.27 and the average family size was 2.61.

The median age in the city was 45.5 years. 16.1% of residents were under the age of 18; 7.7% were between the ages of 18 and 24; 25.9% were from 25 to 44; 32.3% were from 45 to 64; and 18.3% were 65 years of age or older. The gender makeup of the city was 52.7% male and 47.3% female.

=== 2000 census ===
As of the census of 2000, there were 131 people, 52 households, and 39 families living in the city. The population density was 129.2 inhabitants per square mile (49.9/km^{2}). There were 57 housing units at an average density of 56.2 per square mile (21.7/km^{2}). The racial makeup of the city was 100.00% White.

There were 52 households, out of which 30.8% had children under the age of 18 living with them, 63.5% were married couples living together, 9.6% had a female householder with no husband present, and 25.0% were non-families. 19.2% of all households were made up of individuals, and 7.7% had someone living alone who was 65 years of age or older. The average household size was 2.52 and the average family size was 2.79.

In the city, the population was spread out, with 27.5% under the age of 18, 6.1% from 18 to 24, 30.5% from 25 to 44, 26.0% from 45 to 64, and 9.9% who were 65 years of age or older. The median age was 34 years. For every 100 females, there were 98.5 males. For every 100 females age 18 and over, there were 106.5 males.

The median income for a household in the city was $28,125, and the median income for a family was $31,250. Males had a median income of $26,750 versus $20,938 for females. The per capita income for the city was $14,282. There were 24.3% of families and 25.0% of the population living below the poverty line, including 50.0% of under eighteens and 20.0% of those over 64.
