= Liberty Township, Jefferson County, Iowa =

Township in Iowa, USA

Coordinates: 40°57′N 92°00′W

Liberty Township is a township in Jefferson County, Iowa, United States.
