= Abingdon, Iowa =

- Unincorporated community
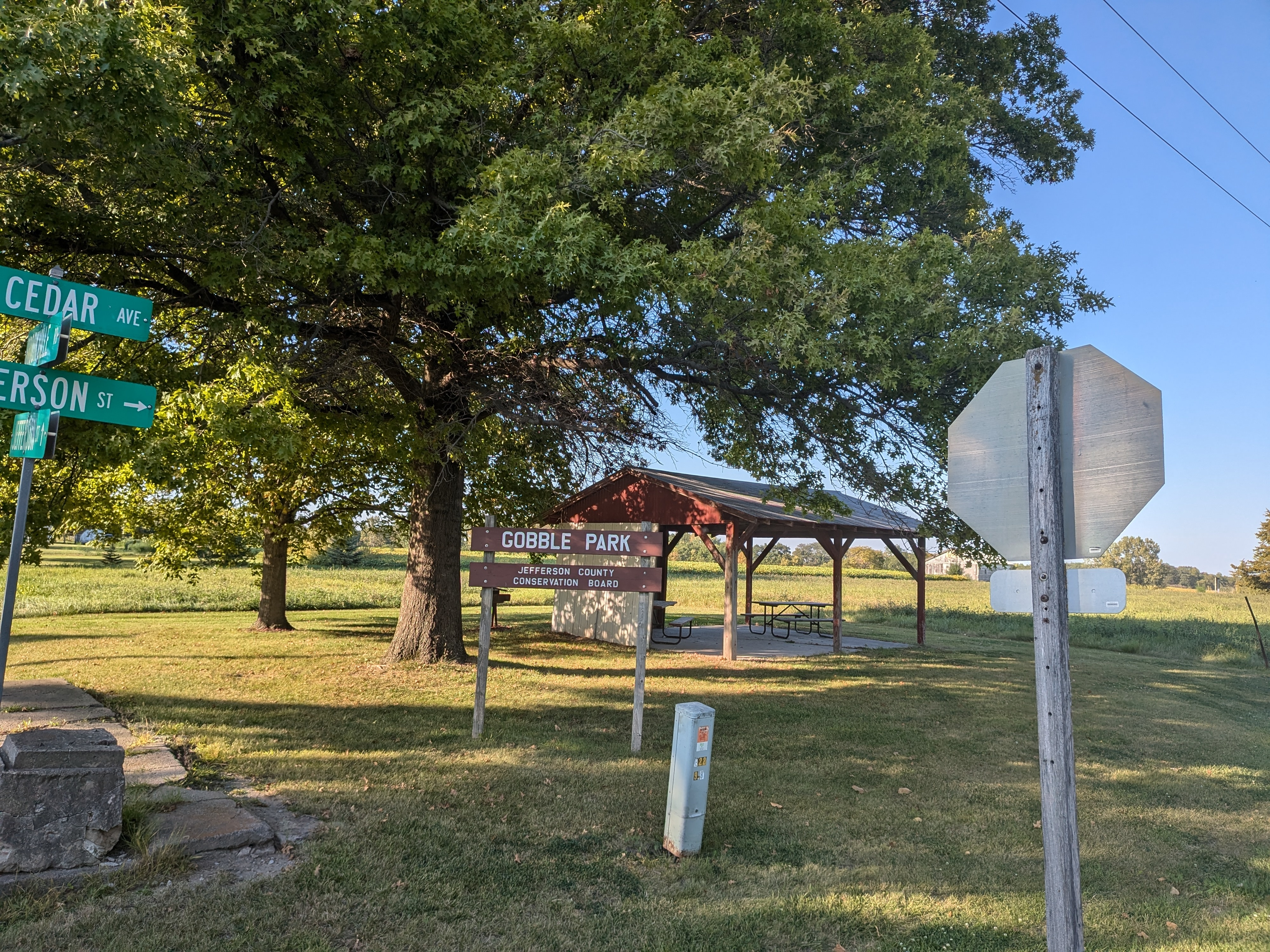
- Gobble Park in Abingdon

- Location within Iowa Location within the United States
- Country: United States
- State: Iowa
- County: Jefferson County
- Time zone: UTC-6 (Central (CST))
  - Summer (DST): UTC-5 (CDT)
- GNIS feature ID: 454078

Abingdon is an unincorporated community in Jefferson County, Iowa, United States. It is located at the intersection of County Road H33 (Brookville Road) and Cedar Avenue, near the west edge of Jefferson County, at 41.082036N, -92.138772W.

== History ==
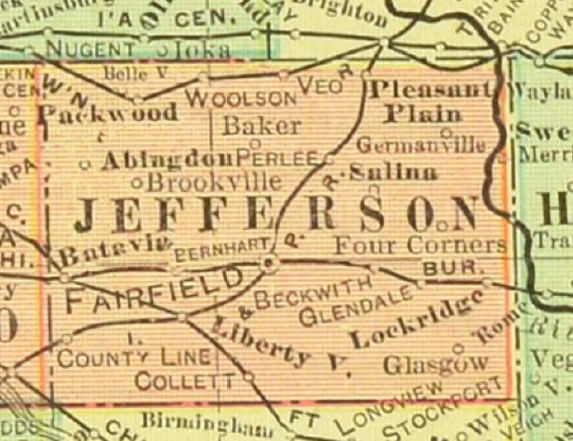
Abingdon in Jefferson County, Iowa, in 1902

Abingdon was founded by Colonel Thomas McCollough in August 1849 and named after Abingdon, Virginia. It was informally named Bogus because one early settler was "alleged to have been a counterfeiter".

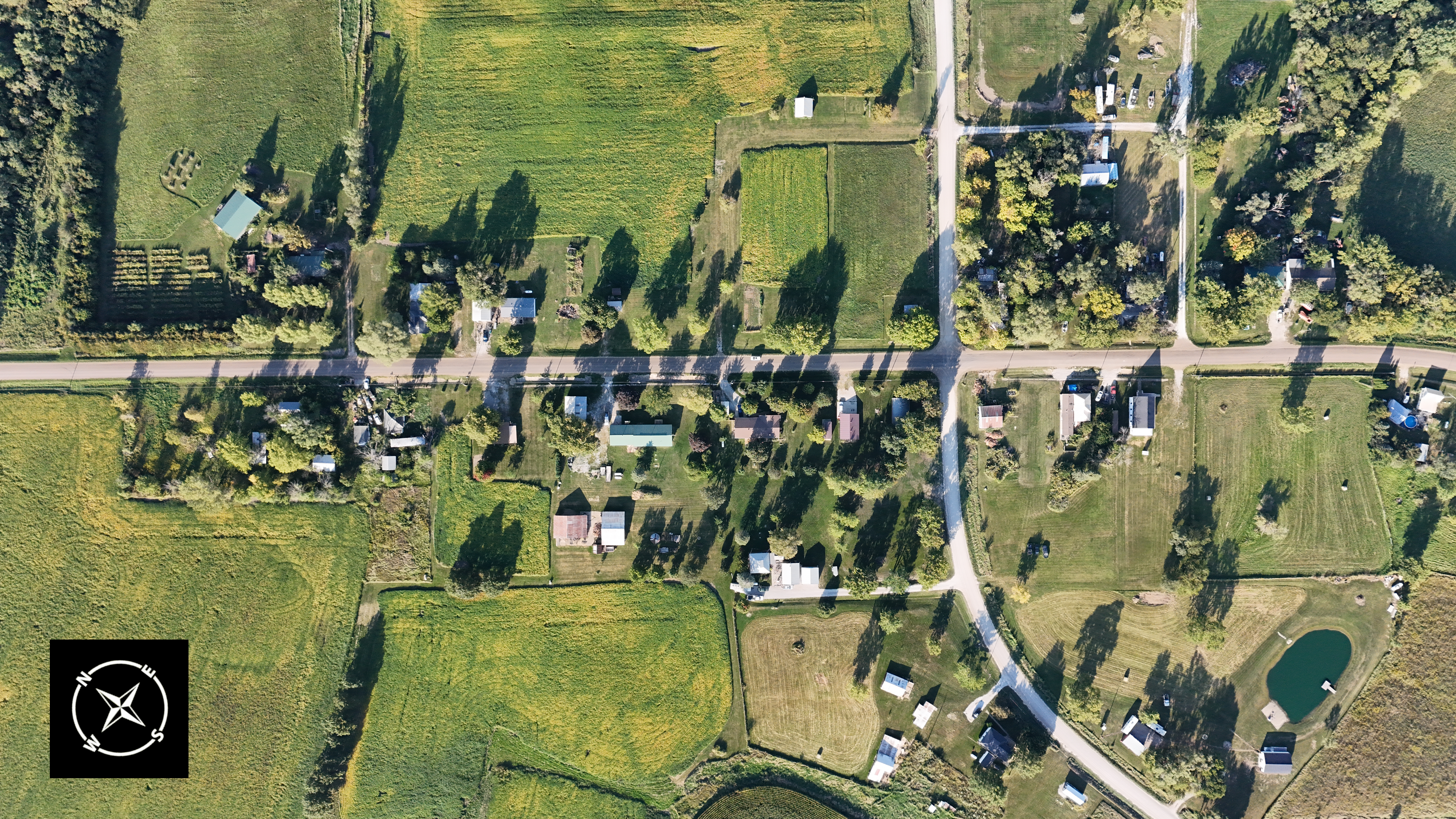
An aerial photo of Abingdon

Abingdon's population was 306 in 1902, 300 in 1925, 60 in 1940, and 140 in 1960.
