= George C. Junkin =

American politician and businessman

George Junkin

14th Secretary of State in Nebraska
- In office 1907–1911
- Preceded by: A. Galusha
- Succeeded by: Addison Wait

Personal details
- Born: June 9, 1858 Salina, Iowa, U.S.
- Died: March 15, 1935 (aged 76) Nebraska, U.S.
- Party: Republican
- Children: 3

George C. Junkin (1858–1935) was an American politician and businessman who served as the 14th Secretary of State in Nebraska. Junkin previously served in both chambers of the Nebraska Legislature.

== Early life ==
Junkin was born in Salina, Iowa on June 9, 1858.

== Career ==
Prior to entering politics, Junkin lived in Montana. He eventually relocated to Gosper County, Nebraska, where he worked as a rancher. He represented the 66th district of the Nebraska House of Representatives. Junkin later served as a member of the Nebraska Senate from the 28th district.

== Personal life ==
Junkin married Emma May Swinburne of Delhi, Iowa in 1885. They had two sons and a daughter. Junkin died March 15, 1935, and is interred in Elwood, Nebraska.
