= Pamela Levy =

Israeli artist (1949–2004)

Pamela Levy פמלה לוי
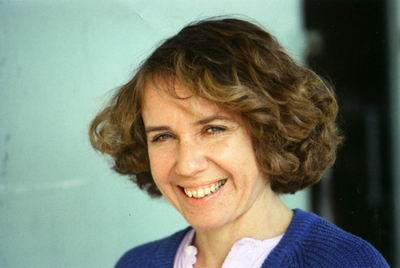
- Born: 1949; Fairfield, Iowa
- Died: 2004; Jerusalem, Israel
- Known for: Painting

Pamela Levy (Hebrew: פמלה לוי; 1949–2004) was an Israeli artist.

== Biography ==
Pamela Denman (later Levy) was born in Fairfield, Iowa. She completed her B.A. at the University of Northern Iowa. In 1972, she moved to New Mexico and joined an artists commune in Santa Fe. In 1976, she immigrated to Israel after converting to Judaism and marrying Itamar Levy, a psychologist and art critic.

In 2004, Levy died in Jerusalem of cardiac arrest.

== Art career ==
Levy's early works were hand-sewn textile collages influenced by the feminist Pattern and Decoration art movement. From the 1980s, she began to paint large figurative oils based on photographs.

== Awards and recognition ==
In 1980, Levy won a Guggenheim Foundation grant. In 1987, she won the Jacques and Eugene O'Hana Prize for a young Israeli artist, and in 1990, she was awarded the Israel Minister of Education and Culture Prize for Painting and Sculpture. She participated in group exhibitions at the Israel Museum in Jerusalem, and held solo exhibitions at the Tel Aviv and Herzliya art museums, as well as art galleries in the United States, Germany, Australia and Israel. In 1996 she received a Heitland Foundation Grant, taking her to Hanover, Germany. The following year she was an Artist in Residence at the Canberra School of Art in Australia.

== Solo exhibitions ==
- 1978 Russ Gallery, Tel Aviv, Israel
- 1979 Debel Gallery, Jerusalem, Israel
- 1981 American Cultural Center, Jerusalem, Israel
- 1981 Artists' House, Jerusalem, Israel
- 1981 Alternate Space Gallery, New York City, United States
- 1982 Ahad Ha'am Gallery, Tel Aviv, Israel
- 1985 Aika Brown Gallery, Artists' Studios, Jerusalem, Israel
- 1987 Gimel Gallery, Jerusalem, Israel
- 1987 Artifact Gallery, Tel Aviv, Israel
- 1989 Aika Brown Gallery, Artists' Studios, Jerusalem, Israel
- 1990 Nelly Aman Gallery, Tel Aviv, Israel
- 1994 "Paintings, 1983-1994", Tel Aviv Museum of Art, Tel Aviv, Israel (catalogue)
- 1995 Galerie im b.i.b., Hanover, Germany (catalogue)
- 1995 Galerie Zonig and Mock, Hanover, Germany (catalogue)
- 1996 Nelly Aman Gallery, Tel Aviv, Israel
- 1996 Kunstverein, Holzminden, Germany
- 1997 Nelly Aman Gallery, Tel Aviv, Israel
- 1997 "Aquarelle und Olbilder", Kunstverein, Gifhorn, Germany
- 1997 Photospace, Canberra School of Art, ANU, Canberra, Australia
- 1999 "Paintings: Class Picture", Herzliya Museum of Art, Herzliya, Israel (catalogue)
- 1999 Nelly Aman Gallery, Tel Aviv, Israel
- 2001 "Paintings", Golconda Fine Art, Tel Aviv, Israel (catalogue)
- 2002 "Woodcuts", Gallery of the David Yelin Teachers Academy, Jerusalem
- 2003 "Pamela's Zoo", Golconda Fine Art, Tel Aviv, Israel (catalogue)

== Book illustrations ==
- 1998 Monsoon: Poems by Media by Dahlia Ravikovitch, with woodcuts by Pamela Levy, Even Hoshen, Ra'anana

== See also ==
- Visual arts in Israel
