= James A. Beck House =

Historic house in Iowa, United States

- U.S. National Register of Historic Places
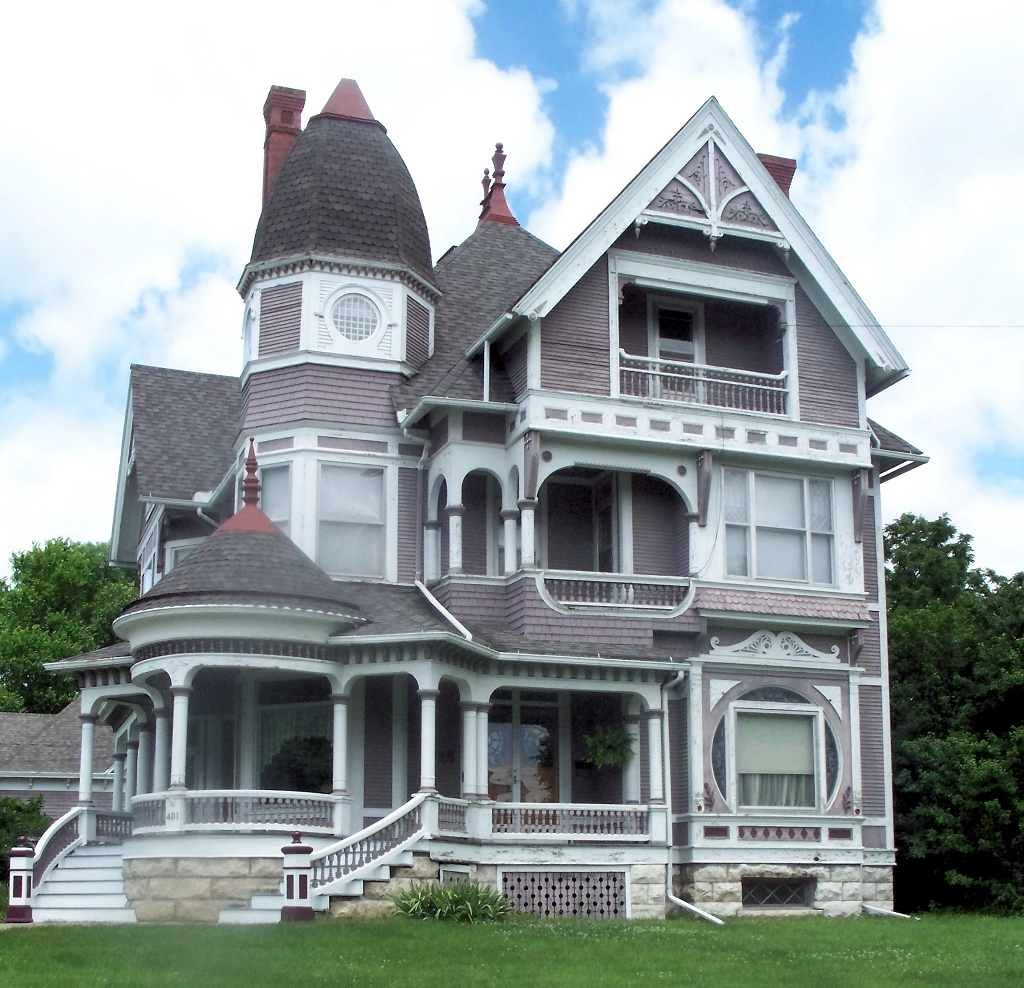

- Location within Iowa Location within the United States
- Location: 401 E. Burlington Ave. Fairfield, Iowa
- Coordinates: 41°0′25″N 91°57′29″W
- Area: less than one acre
- Built: 1896
- Architect: George F. Barber & Co.
- Architectural style: Queen Anne
- NRHP reference No.: 78001225
- Added to NRHP: March 29, 1978

The James A. Beck House, also known as the Sloca House, is a historic residence located at 401 East Burlington Avenue in Fairfield, Iowa, United States. Built in 1896 for hotelier James A. Beck from a customized pattern by George F. Barber & Co. of Knoxville, Tennessee, the Queen Anne house was listed on the National Register of Historic Places in 1978. Known locally by several names over the years, including the "Ball House" and the "Purple House", it has been owned since 2020 by Richard and Kendra Lint, who have undertaken an ongoing restoration of the property.

== James A. Beck ==
James A. Beck was born in Fairfield in 1849 and educated at Fairfield University. He entered the grocery business in 1870 in partnership with Thomas Bell, becoming sole owner two years later. In 1883 he began a second, more profitable career as a hotelier when he leased and managed the Leggett House, an established hotel in Fairfield, and in 1889 he leased the Summit House hotel in Creston as a partner in the Creston Hotel Company.

Beck's business interests expanded substantially in the 1890s. In 1896, the same year his Fairfield house was completed, he purchased Dixon's Beach, a financially troubled resort on West Okoboji Lake in Dickinson County. There he opened The Inn in 1898, a hotel some 450 feet long with a large dance pavilion built over the water, which became one of the most popular resorts in the Iowa Great Lakes region and operated into the middle of the 20th century. Around 1910, Beck and a partner purchased additional lakefront property for a proposed development called Lakewood Park, envisioned as an Iowa "Venice" of canals and islands; the project was never completed, though Beck began the Crescent Beach Hotel there in 1914 and sold it two years later.

== Architecture ==
The nomination to the National Register includes both the main house and its carriage house. The house is based on a mail-order pattern sold by George F. Barber & Co., whose plans could be customized for an additional fee; the Beck House appears to have been customized, as it is more elaborate than most examples, and the National Register nomination describes it as a larger and more florid variation on the pattern than the Linsay House in Iowa City or a similar house in Calvert, Texas. A reproduction of Barber's catalog Cottage Souvenir Number Two is held by the Fairfield Public Library.

The 2½-story frame house follows an irregular plan and is built on a stone foundation. The nomination cites it as strongly representative of the Americanized Queen Anne style, with agitated massing, varied decorative detail and surface materials, and exterior covered spaces cut into the mass, unified by Stick Style framing members that divide the clapboarding into rectangular panels. Its most striking feature is a polygonal turret rising from the second floor over the front veranda; the turret encloses a game room in the attic and is crowned by a domical roof of imbricated shingles. A circular porch pavilion capped by a flattened conical roof stands beside two flights of stone steps leading to the veranda, and two additional front porches occupy the second level, enclosed by an arcade of arches of varying curvature, and the third level, framed in a contrasting square. A keyhole window in the front parlor is framed with pilasters and crowned by a swan's-neck pediment, and the high hipped roof carries a finial crest broken by gables of varying size. Inside, a multi-landing staircase and alcove in the stairhall reflect the influence of the "living hall" concept associated with English architect Richard Norman Shaw.

=== Carriage house ===
A two-story carriage house stands behind the main house, facing North D Street. It is a square structure with a high hipped roof, gabled wall and roof dormers, a bracketed cornice, and clapboard siding with a wide band of diamond-pattern stickwork; its wide entrance is segmentally arched. The lower level retains its original horse stalls and feeders, along with a small room that appears to have served as quarters for a caretaker, and the upper haymow includes stained glass windows.

Accounts of the carriage house's construction date differ. The National Register nomination and traditional local accounts date it to about 1875, associating it with an earlier house on the property attributed to Judge Charles Negus, which was demolished to make way for Beck's residence. A May 1895 issue of the Fairfield Ledger, located by the current owners, reported that Beck built the barn and carriage house in 1895, and the Iowa Barn Foundation also dates the structure to 1895.

== Later history ==
Joseph Ball, an area cattleman, purchased the house in 1910, and it remained in the Ball family until 1964, when it was bought by Charles Sloca, a professor at Parsons College, and his wife Joan. The house was white when the Slocas acquired it; they repainted it a grayed lavender that their research indicated was a traditional period color, giving rise to the local nickname the "Purple House". Charles Sloca prepared the property's National Register nomination, which was submitted in 1977; the house was listed on the National Register of Historic Places on March 29, 1978, on the basis of its architecture.

After raising their family in the house, the Slocas sold it in 2001 to Mitchell Bailey of Phoenix, Arizona, an admirer of Barber houses who planned to operate it as an inn. Mark and Donita Woodruff subsequently purchased the house from Bailey and remodeled it over roughly nine years of ownership. The house later sat vacant until its purchase in 2020.

== Lint ownership and restoration ==
In July 2020, Richard and Kendra Lint purchased the house after relocating from Portland, Oregon. Kendra Lint first saw the house on the Cheap Old Houses Instagram account, having long admired Barber's architecture in Portland, where a comparable house was unaffordable to the couple. The Lints own This Old Game, a business that restores and reproduces artwork for vintage arcade games, which they relocated to Fairfield along with their residence.

Since acquiring the property, the couple has carried out an ongoing renovation, alternating between interior and exterior projects, and has documented the work on a Facebook page and on their YouTube channel, Greetings from Fairfield. They have also collected historical materials related to the house, including photographs and canceled checks signed by Beck, which they store in an antique safe in the basement.

The Lints have researched the house's historical paint colors by sanding through accumulated layers of paint in undisturbed areas and comparing the exposed colors against dated photographs of the house. They identified the original 1896 body color as a dark maroon, had it color-matched from a surviving sample, and in 2026 began returning the house's decorative trim, including its porch skirts and columns, to that color. Their sanding samples indicated the house was repainted roughly every 15 to 20 years, in sage green in the early 1910s, yellow around 1930, and gray from the 1940s until the Slocas' lavender repainting in the 1970s, and that the porch ceilings historically matched the body color, with the present light blue dating from the mid-2000s.

The house has been opened to the public on several occasions under the Lints' ownership. It was among five houses featured in Fairfield's first "Tour of Five Distinctive Homes" in September 2023. In June 2026, the carriage house was featured on the Iowa Barn Foundation's Spring Barn Tour of Jefferson County, with a portion of the house's first floor also open to visitors; the two-day tour of 21 barns and the carriage house drew visitors from eight states.

The Lints decorate the house seasonally, including for Independence Day, Halloween, and Christmas; Richard Lint has said the holiday decorating takes about two weeks each year, with him handling the exterior and Kendra the interior. In December 2023, the house took first place in Fairfield's inaugural Christmas Light Showdown, a community decorating contest in which 16 homes participated and nearly 200 residents voted.
