= Golden Domes =

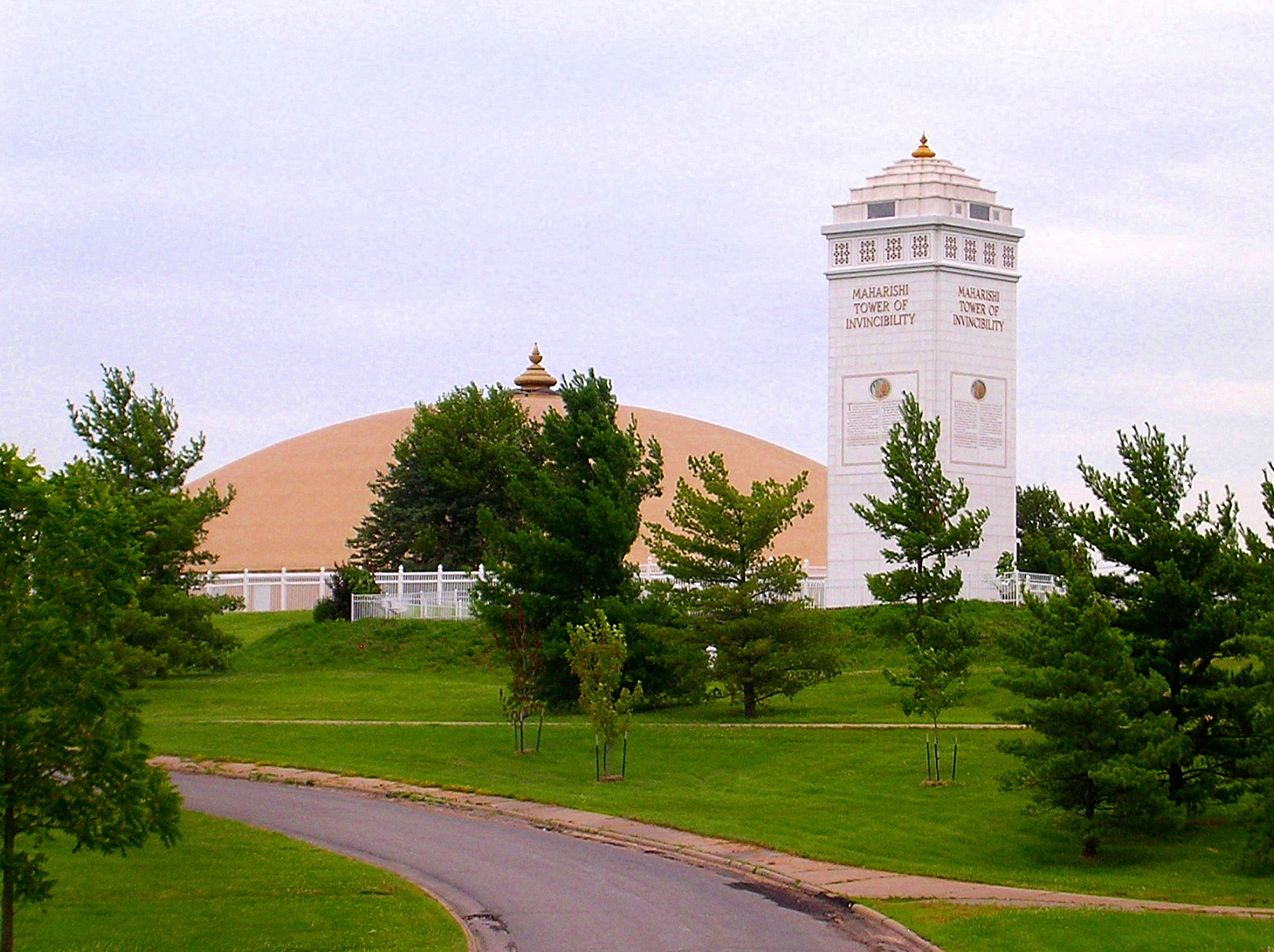
- Golden dome and tower

- Location within Iowa
- Alternative names: The Maharishi Patanjali and Bagambhrini Golden Domes of Pure Knowledge

General information
- Type: Domes
- Location: Fairfield, Iowa
- Coordinates: 41.021389°N 91.965644°W
- Construction started: 1979
- Completed: 1981
- Cost: US$700,000
- Owner: Maharishi University of Management

Height
- Height: 35 ft (11 m)

Dimensions
- Diameter: 200 ft (61 m)

Technical details
- Floor area: 25,000 sq ft (2,300 m^{2})

Design and construction
- Architect: H.O. Clark

The Golden Domes, also called the Maharishi Golden Domes, are twin buildings on the campus of Maharishi International University (MIU) in Fairfield, Iowa, United States, built in 1980 and 1981. According to MIU, the Golden Domes were the first structures built specifically for group meditation and the practice of the TM-Sidhi program, including yogic flying. In 2001 and 2005 they received additional construction including landscaping, perimeter fencing and new entrances.

== Description ==
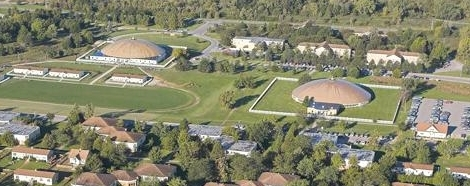
Aerial photograph showing the Golden Domes.

Each dome is 20,000–25,000 square feet (1,900–2,300 m^{2}) in area, about 150–200 feet (46–61 m) in diameter, and about 35 feet (11 m) high and are said to dominate the MIU campus. The roofs of the domes are covered with spray polyurethane foam. The domes are mentioned in a number of travel guides and are considered "don't miss" landmarks for Fairfield tourists. The domes have been variously described by journalists as looking like: "a huge rotunda", "flying saucers", "extraterrestrial-looking", "gilded breasts", "Mallomar-cookie-shaped", "giant mushrooms", and "sprawling structures".

== History ==
In the summer of 1979, during a "World Peace Assembly" in Amherst, Massachusetts, the Maharishi invited TM and TM-Sidhi practitioners to come together for group meditation in Fairfield and ordered the construction of two domes for this purpose. University president, Bevan Morris, oversaw the effort and according to MIU, the domes were the first structures built for the purpose of group practice of the Maharishi's TM-Sidhi program (capacity 3,000). Construction began in the fall of 1979 and the first dome was inaugurated in December by the Maharishi. Ravi Shankar (later known as "Sri Sri Ravi Shankar") and two other Indian pandits chanted Vedic hymns during the inaugural ceremony. The second Dome, completed in 1981, was reportedly built on the site of the campus baseball field. Each dome's usage was declared gender specific to avoid distraction by the presence of the opposite sex. According to the university's yearbook, the Maharishi named the domes, "The Maharishi Patanjali dome and the Bagambhrini Golden Dome of Pure Knowledge" in 1983.

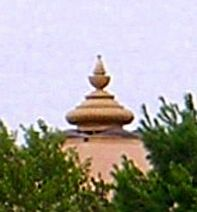
Rooftop cupola shaped like a kalasha.

Each dome is topped with a kalasha. These rooftop sculptures are 7.5 ft (2.9 m) tall and 5 ft (1.5 m) wide and were cast in acrylic resin by a university professor in 1997. Surrounding areas and berms were also flattened and auspicious fencing was added around each dome in 1999. Later some aspects of the building were deemed inauspicious and western entrances were replaced with east facing entrances for one of the domes in 2001. An expanded vestibule on the east side includes a large room for coats and shoes and the performance of Yoga positions or asanas. The eastern end of one dome was squared-off, to align it with the philosophy of Maharishi Sthapatya Veda (MSV) architecture. The entry to the second dome was moved in 2005 and bathrooms were added, replacing a temporary trailer which had been used for the purpose. In accordance with the MSV architectural philosophy the domes were topped by cupolas called kalashes. In 2008 the roof of the Maharishi Patanjali dome was resurfaced and repainted.

== Other resources ==
- "Golden Dome: To Fly High" DVD Color, 30 mins. Published in 1980. A documentary about the building of the first dome.
