= Cedar Township, Jefferson County, Iowa =

Township in Iowa, USA

Coordinates: 40°57′N 91°53′W

Cedar Township is a township in Jefferson County, Iowa, United States.
