= Penn Township, Jefferson County, Iowa =

Township in Jefferson County, Iowa, U.S.

Coordinates: 41°07′N 91°54′W

Penn Township is a township in Jefferson County, Iowa, United States.

The small city of Pleasant Plain and the former hamlet of Veo are within the geographic bounds of the township.
