= Black Hawk Township, Jefferson County, Iowa =

Coordinates: 41.12°N 92.00°W

Black Hawk Township
- Township
- Interactive map of Black Hawk Township
- Country: United States
- State: Iowa
- County: Jefferson County
- Established: Unknown

Area
  - Total: 36.7 sq mi (95 km^{2})
  - Land: 36.7 sq mi (95 km^{2})
  - Water: 0 sq mi (0 km^{2})

Population
  - Total: 327
- Time zone: UTC-6 (CST)
  - Summer (DST): UTC-5 (CDT)

Black Hawk Township is located in Jefferson County, Iowa. The population as of the 2020 Census is 327. The land area is 36.7 square miles (95.1 km^{2}) with no water area.
