= Jefferson County Courthouse (Iowa) =

- U.S. National Register of Historic Places
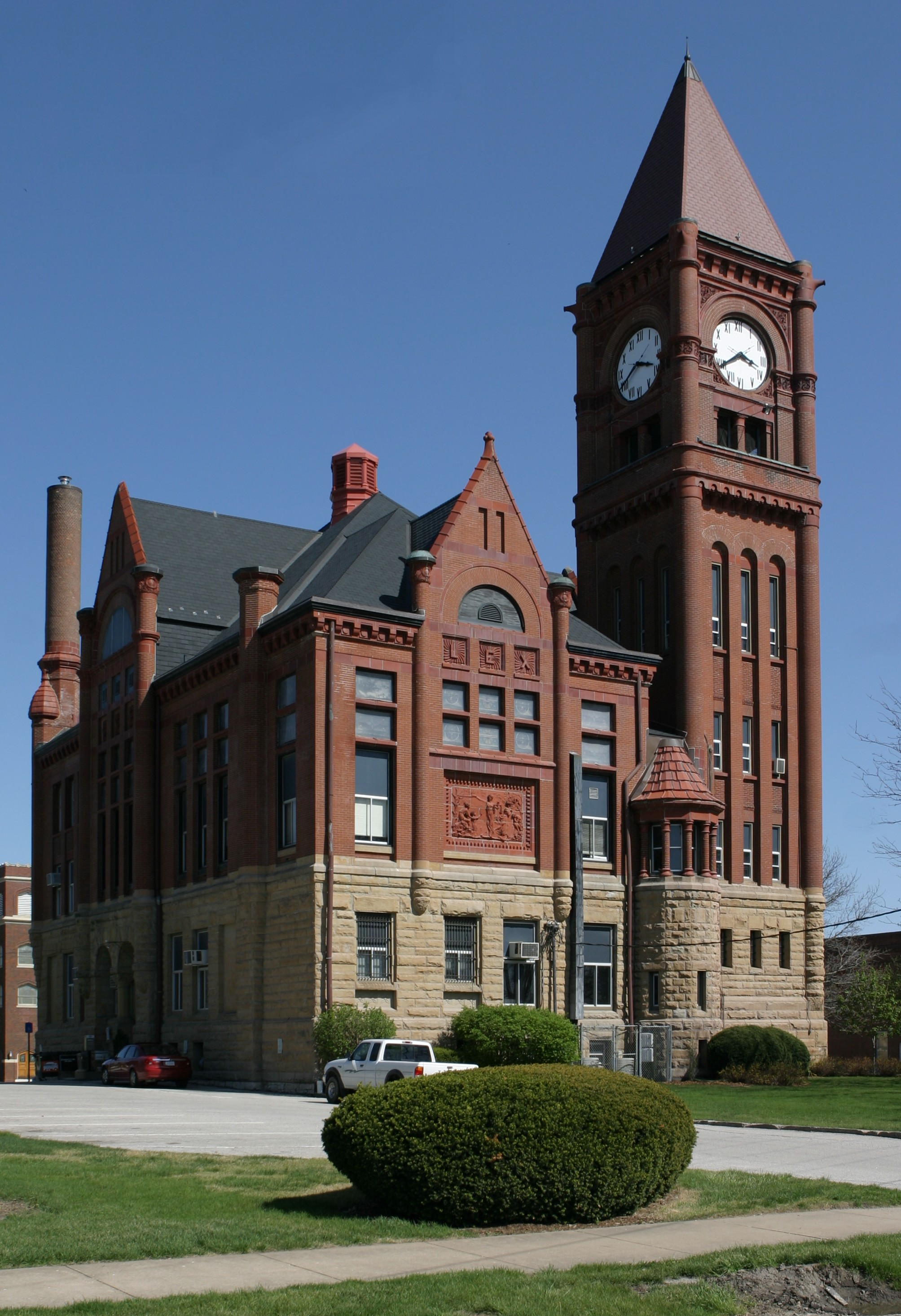

- Location within Iowa Location within the United States
- Location: Court St. between Briggs and Hempstead Aves. Fairfield, Iowa
- Coordinates: 41°0′37″N 91°57′55″W
- Area: less than one acre
- Built: 1893
- Architect: H.C. Koch
- Architectural style: Romanesque
- MPS: County Courthouses in Iowa TR
- NRHP reference No.: 81000250
- Added to NRHP: July 2, 1981

The Jefferson County Courthouse located in Fairfield, Iowa, United States was built from 1890 to 1893. It was listed on the National Register of Historic Places in 1981 as a part of the County Courthouses in Iowa Thematic Resource. The courthouse is the third building the county has used for court functions and county administration.

== History ==
Jefferson County's first courthouse was built in 1840. It was a two-story frame structure with a gabled roof. After its use as a courthouse, the building housed skilled craftsmen until it was destroyed in a fire in 1916. It was replaced by a 70-by-40-foot (21 by 12 m) structure that was built of brick in 1851. By 1875 the building was in poor condition and court sessions were held in Harmony Church. The courthouse was abandoned in 1880. A poor economy delayed the construction of a new courthouse with three successive failed bond referendums. A special election on November 20, 1890, authorized construction. The Romanesque Revival building was completed three years later at a cost of $73,630.87.

== Architecture ==
The Jefferson County Courthouse is similar to the Montgomery County Courthouse in Red Oak, especially in its composition, facade treatment, and their clock towers. The Milwaukee architectural firm H.C. Koch is believed to have designed both. The exterior is constructed in Cleveland grey sandstone on the first level and brick on the rest. The interior features woodwork in native oak. The clock tower roof was removed in 1948, and it has been subsequently restored.
