= Round Prairie Township, Jefferson County, Iowa =

Township in Jefferson County, Iowa, U.S.

Coordinates: 40°57′N 91°47′W

Round Prairie Township is a township in Jefferson County, Iowa, United States.

A 101-acre Round Prairie Park in the township has been developed by the Jefferson County Conservation Board. It has a campground, fishing ponds, and a mix of prairie and timber landscapes.

The 275-acre Cedar Creek Timber & Wetland near the township offers hiking, bird watching, observing nature, hunting and fishing.
