= Polk Township, Jefferson County, Iowa =

Township in Jefferson County, Iowa, U.S.

Coordinates: 41°07′N 92°07′W

Polk Township is a township in Jefferson County, Iowa, United States.
