= Jefferson County, Iowa =

County in Iowa, United States

- County
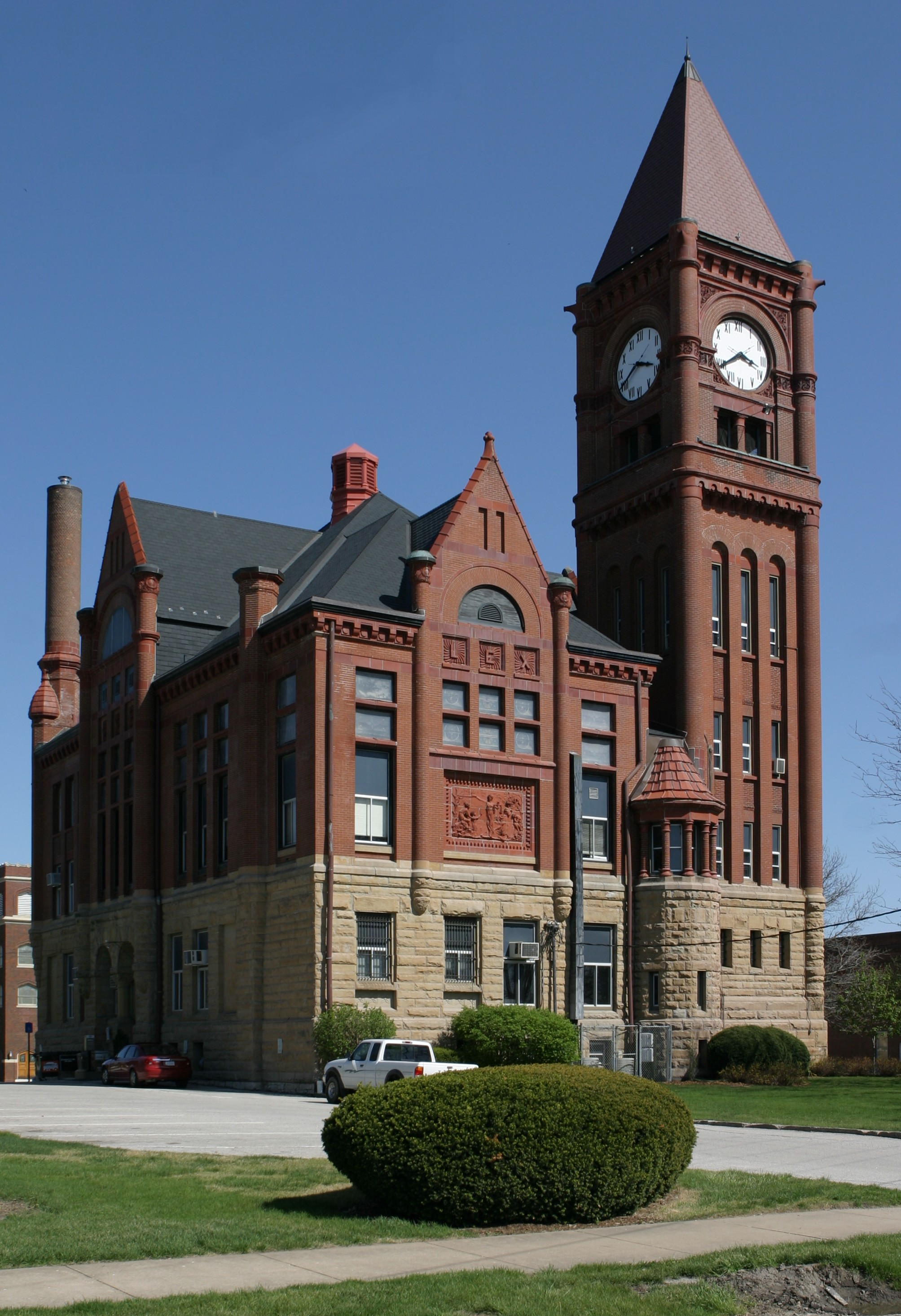
- The Courthouse in Fairfield is on the NRHP

- Location within the U.S. state of Iowa
- Coordinates: 41°01′53″N 91°56′41″W
- Country: United States
- State: Iowa
- Founded: January 21, 1839
- Named for: Thomas Jefferson
- Seat: Fairfield
- Largest city: Fairfield

Area
  - Total: 437 sq mi (1,130 km^{2})
  - Land: 436 sq mi (1,130 km^{2})
  - Water: 1.4 sq mi (3.6 km^{2}) 0.3%

Population (2020)
  - Total: 15,663
  - Estimate (2025): 15,291 ▼
  - Density: 35.9/sq mi (13.9/km^{2})
- Time zone: UTC−6 (Central)
  - Summer (DST): UTC−5 (CDT)
- Congressional district: 1st
- Website: https://jeffersoncounty.iowa.gov/
- Iowa county number 51

Jefferson County is a county located in the U.S. state of Iowa. As of the 2020 United States census, the population was 15,663. The county seat is Fairfield. The county was formed in January 1839, and was named for U.S. President Thomas Jefferson. Jefferson County comprises the Fairfield, IA Micropolitan Statistical Area.

== Geography ==
According to the United States Census Bureau, the county has a total area of 437 square miles (1,130 km^{2}), of which 436 square miles (1,130 km^{2}) is land and 1.4 square miles (3.6 km^{2}) (0.3%) is water. The Skunk River flows southward through the NE part of the county, while the SW part of the county is drained by the nearby Des Moines River, which flows southeastward through Van Buren and Wapello counties.

=== Major highways ===
- U.S. Highway 34
- Iowa Highway 1
- Iowa Highway 78

=== Adjacent counties ===
- Keokuk County − northwest
- Washington County − northeast
- Henry County − east
- Van Buren County − south
- Wapello County − west

== Demographics ==
Historical population
| Census | Pop. | Note | %± |
|---|---|---|---|
| 1850 | 9,904 | | — |
| 1860 | 15,038 | | 51.8% |
| 1870 | 17,839 | | 18.6% |
| 1880 | 17,469 | | −2.1% |
| 1890 | 15,184 | | −13.1% |
| 1900 | 17,437 | | 14.8% |
| 1910 | 15,951 | | −8.5% |
| 1920 | 16,440 | | 3.1% |
| 1930 | 16,241 | | −1.2% |
| 1940 | 15,762 | | −2.9% |
| 1950 | 15,696 | | −0.4% |
| 1960 | 15,818 | | 0.8% |
| 1970 | 15,774 | | −0.3% |
| 1980 | 16,316 | | 3.4% |
| 1990 | 16,310 | | 0.0% |
| 2000 | 16,181 | | −0.8% |
| 2010 | 16,843 | | 4.1% |
| 2020 | 15,663 | | −7.0% |
| 2025 (est.) | 15,291 | ▼ | −2.4% |
U.S. Decennial Census; 1790–1960 1900–1990; 1990–2000 2010–2020

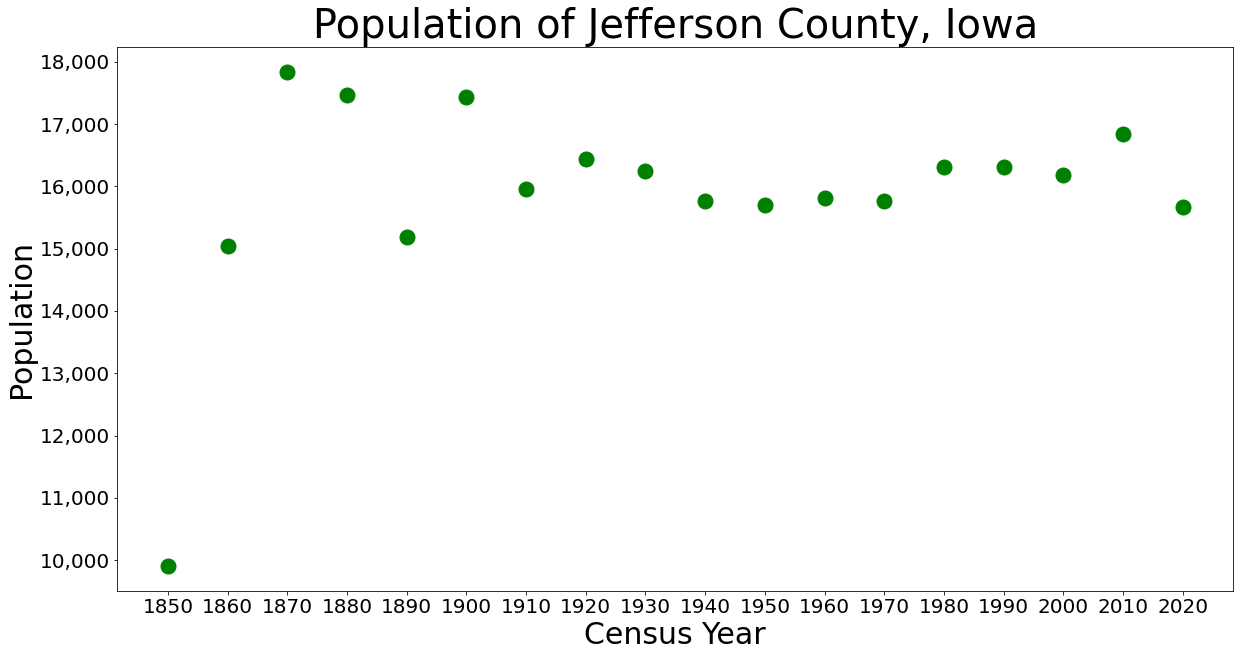
Population of Jefferson County from the U.S. census data

=== 2020 census ===
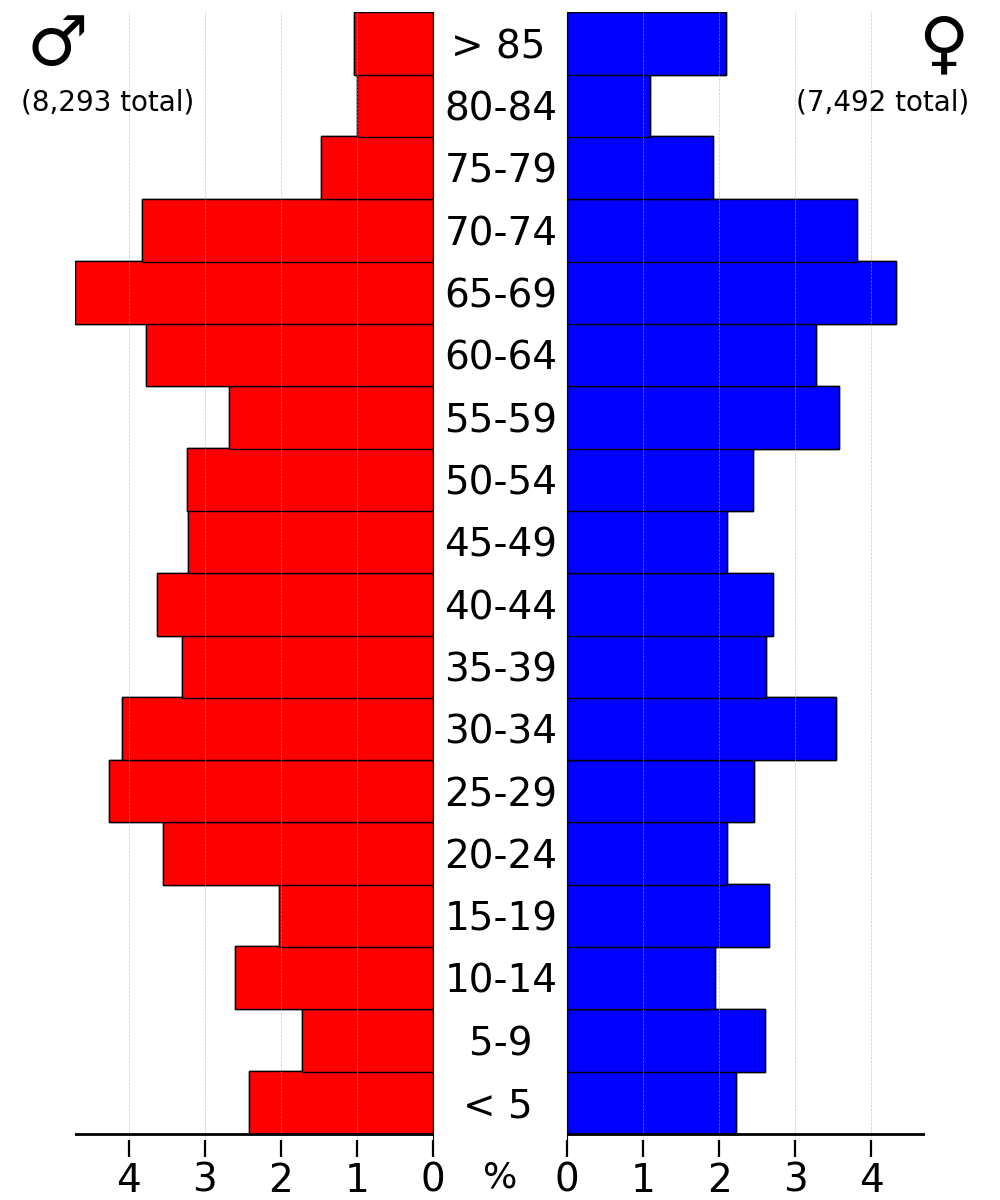
2022 US Census population pyramid for Jefferson County from ACS 5-year estimates

As of the 2020 census, the county had a population of 15,663 and a population density of 35.9/sq mi (13.9/km^{2}).

The median age was 46.3 years. 18.8% of residents were under the age of 18 and 27.5% of residents were 65 years of age or older. For every 100 females there were 104.6 males, and for every 100 females age 18 and over there were 103.1 males age 18 and over.

There were 6,902 households in the county, of which 22.1% had children under the age of 18 living in them. Of all households, 43.5% were married-couple households, 23.6% were households with a male householder and no spouse or partner present, and 26.9% were households with a female householder and no spouse or partner present. About 37.2% of all households were made up of individuals and 19.7% had someone living alone who was 65 years of age or older.

There were 7,689 housing units, of which 6,902 were occupied. Among occupied housing units, 66.2% were owner-occupied and 33.8% were renter-occupied. The homeowner vacancy rate was 2.0% and the rental vacancy rate was 8.4%.

58.8% of residents lived in urban areas, while 41.2% lived in rural areas.

The racial makeup of the county was 86.6% White, 2.7% Black or African American, 0.4% American Indian and Alaska Native, 3.2% Asian, 0.1% Native Hawaiian and Pacific Islander, 2.0% from some other race, and 5.1% from two or more races. Hispanic or Latino residents of any race comprised 3.9% of the population.

Jefferson County Racial Composition
| Race | Number | Percent |
|---|---|---|
| White (NH) | 13,425 | 85.71% |
| Black or African American (NH) | 409 | 2.61% |
| Native American (NH) | 43 | 0.27% |
| Asian (NH) | 500 | 3.2% |
| Pacific Islander (NH) | 9 | .06% |
| Other/Mixed (NH) | 667 | 4.3% |
| Hispanic or Latino | 610 | 4% |

=== 2010 census ===
The 2010 census recorded a population of 16,843 in the county, with a population density of 38.7/sq mi (14.9/km^{2}). There were 7,594 housing units, of which 6,846 were occupied.

=== 2000 census ===
As of the 2000 United States census, there were 16,181 people, 6,649 households, and 4,281 families in the county. The population density was 37 inhabitants per square mile (14/km^{2}). There were 7,241 housing units at an average density of 17 per square mile (6.6/km^{2}). The racial makeup of the county was 96.02% White, 0.64% Black or African American, 0.17% Native American, 1.70% Asian, 0.04% Pacific Islander, 0.53% from other races, and 0.91% from two or more races. 1.84% of the population were Hispanic or Latino of any race.

There were 6,649 households, out of which 31.10% had children under the age of 18 living with them, 53.10% were married couples living together, 8.00% had a female householder with no husband present, and 35.60% were non-families. 30.40% of all households were made up of individuals, and 10.70% had someone living alone who was 65 years of age or older. The average household size was 2.34 and the average family size was 2.93.

The county population contained 24.40% under the age of 18, 7.60% from 18 to 24, 24.40% from 25 to 44, 29.80% from 45 to 64, and 13.80% who were 65 years of age or older. The median age was 41 years. For every 100 females, there were 95.90 males. For every 100 females age 18 and over, there were 93.60 males.

The median income for a household in the county was $33,851, and the median income for a family was $43,819. Males had a median income of $32,066 versus $22,479 for females. The per capita income for the county was $19,579. About 7.40% of families and 10.90% of the population were below the poverty line, including 12.40% of those under age 18 and 9.00% of those age 65 or over.

== Law and government ==
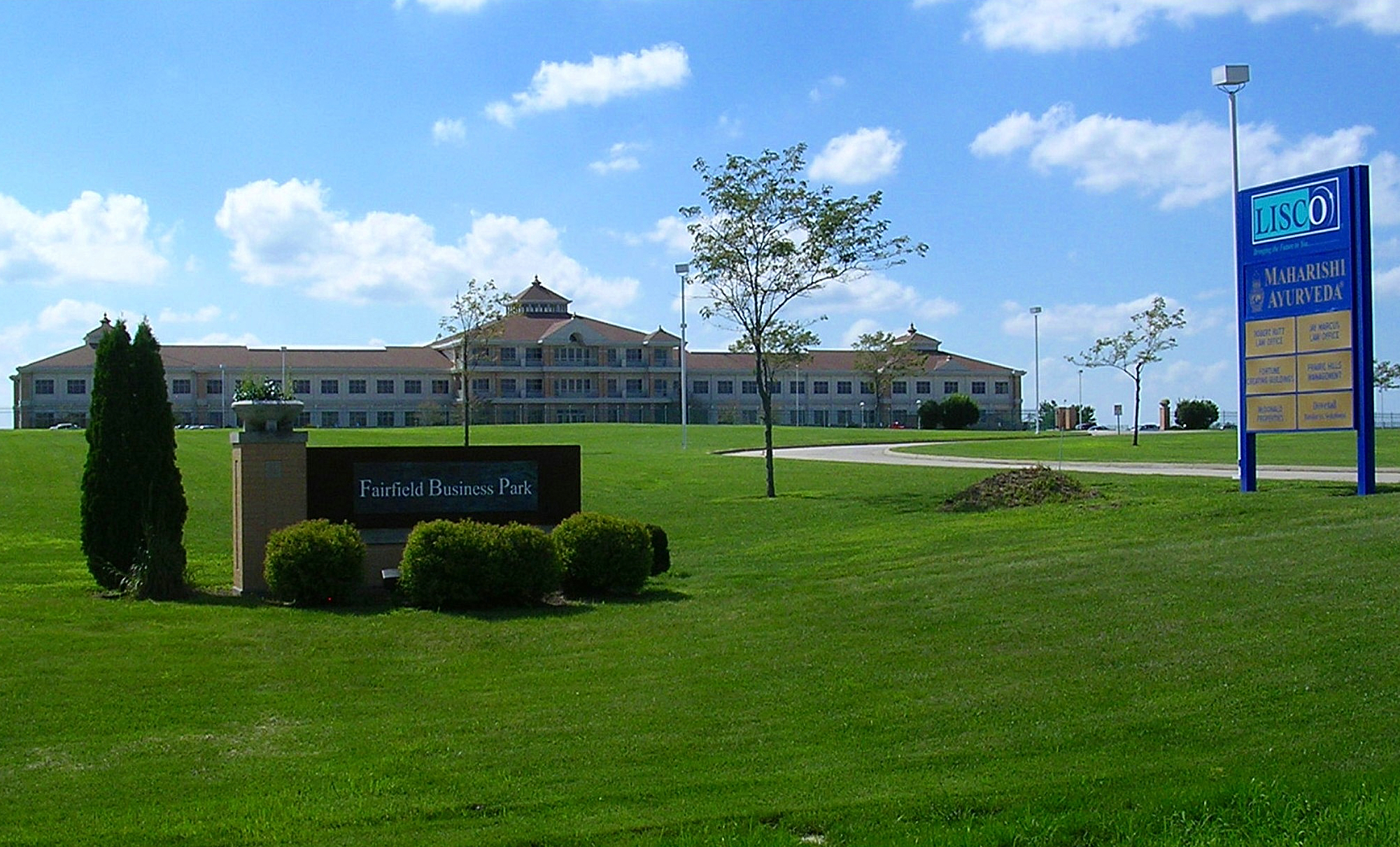
Fairfield Business Park built north of Fairfield, in 1998.

Jefferson County's executive branch is a three-member board of supervisors who are elected to four-year terms. Other elected officials are county auditor, county sheriff, county treasurer, and county recorder.

=== Politics ===
Historically, Jefferson County heavily favored presidential candidates from the Republican Party. It is noted for being one of the few counties in Iowa that never voted for Woodrow Wilson, along with having never given a Democrat who carried the county over sixty percent of the vote. In recent decades, politics within the county have become more competitive. From 1992 to 2012, the county had been carried by the Democratic presidential candidate in every election with the exception of 2000, when George W. Bush obtained a plurality. In the 1996 presidential election, Jefferson County was the only county in the United States to give any (winning) candidate less than forty percent of the vote, with Bill Clinton winning the county 35.1% to Bob Dole's 34.4%. In 2024, Donald Trump became the first Republican to win a majority of the votes in Jefferson County since Ronald Reagan's 1984 performance. The county has been the strongest basis of support for the Natural Law Party's presidential campaigns, due to the presence of the Maharishi Vedic City and Maharishi International University.

United States presidential election results for Jefferson County, Iowa
| Year | Republican | | Democratic | | Third party(ies) | |
| Year | No. | % | No. | % | No. | % |
|---|---|---|---|---|---|---|
| 1896 | 2,478 | 57.24% | 1,772 | 40.93% | 79 | 1.82% |
| 1900 | 2,482 | 58.73% | 1,612 | 38.14% | 132 | 3.12% |
| 1904 | 2,330 | 62.23% | 1,172 | 31.30% | 242 | 6.46% |
| 1908 | 2,271 | 58.29% | 1,439 | 36.94% | 186 | 4.77% |
| 1912 | 1,378 | 37.63% | 1,311 | 35.80% | 973 | 26.57% |
| 1916 | 2,167 | 54.61% | 1,734 | 43.70% | 67 | 1.69% |
| 1920 | 4,558 | 74.62% | 1,450 | 23.74% | 100 | 1.64% |
| 1924 | 4,062 | 61.61% | 1,249 | 18.94% | 1,282 | 19.44% |
| 1928 | 4,919 | 69.05% | 2,159 | 30.31% | 46 | 0.65% |
| 1932 | 2,955 | 41.56% | 4,056 | 57.05% | 99 | 1.39% |
| 1936 | 4,037 | 50.84% | 3,690 | 46.47% | 214 | 2.69% |
| 1940 | 4,891 | 58.67% | 3,402 | 40.81% | 43 | 0.52% |
| 1944 | 4,335 | 59.03% | 2,926 | 39.84% | 83 | 1.13% |
| 1948 | 3,906 | 55.11% | 3,033 | 42.79% | 149 | 2.10% |
| 1952 | 5,630 | 69.09% | 2,470 | 30.31% | 49 | 0.60% |
| 1956 | 4,807 | 62.76% | 2,845 | 37.15% | 7 | 0.09% |
| 1960 | 4,942 | 64.00% | 2,780 | 36.00% | 0 | 0.00% |
| 1964 | 2,755 | 39.84% | 4,135 | 59.79% | 26 | 0.38% |
| 1968 | 4,130 | 59.52% | 2,411 | 34.75% | 398 | 5.74% |
| 1972 | 4,628 | 64.83% | 2,362 | 33.09% | 149 | 2.09% |
| 1976 | 3,746 | 51.71% | 3,377 | 46.62% | 121 | 1.67% |
| 1980 | 4,099 | 56.16% | 2,577 | 35.31% | 623 | 8.54% |
| 1984 | 4,727 | 61.19% | 2,961 | 38.33% | 37 | 0.48% |
| 1988 | 3,614 | 49.53% | 3,594 | 49.26% | 88 | 1.21% |
| 1992 | 2,541 | 30.46% | 2,562 | 30.72% | 3,238 | 38.82% |
| 1996 | 2,541 | 34.35% | 2,597 | 35.11% | 2,259 | 30.54% |
| 2000 | 3,248 | 43.03% | 2,863 | 37.93% | 1,437 | 19.04% |
| 2004 | 3,648 | 44.05% | 4,490 | 54.22% | 143 | 1.73% |
| 2008 | 3,324 | 38.51% | 5,070 | 58.73% | 238 | 2.76% |
| 2012 | 3,436 | 40.28% | 4,798 | 56.25% | 296 | 3.47% |
| 2016 | 3,748 | 45.95% | 3,710 | 45.49% | 698 | 8.56% |
| 2020 | 4,443 | 49.59% | 4,319 | 48.21% | 197 | 2.20% |
| 2024 | 4,353 | 52.16% | 3,788 | 45.39% | 205 | 2.46% |

== Communities ==
=== Cities ===
- Batavia
- Coppock (partial)
- Fairfield
- Libertyville
- Lockridge
- Maharishi Vedic City
- Packwood
- Pleasant Plain

=== Unincorporated communities ===
- Abingdon
- Beckwith
- East Pleasant Plain
- Germanville
- Glasgow
- Perlee
- Salina
- Veo

=== Townships ===
- Black Hawk
- Buchanan
- Cedar
- Center
- Des Moines
- Liberty
- Lockridge
- Locust Grove
- Penn
- Polk
- Round Prairie
- Walnut

=== Population ranking ===
The population ranking of the following table is based on the 2020 census of Jefferson County.

† county seat

| Rank | City/Town/etc. | Municipal type | Population (2020 Census) |
|---|---|---|---|
| 1 | † Fairfield | City | 9,416 |
| 2 | Batavia | City | 430 |
| 3 | Maharishi Vedic City | City | 277 |
| 4 | Libertyville | City | 274 |
| 5 | Lockridge | City | 244 |
| 6 | Packwood | City | 183 |
| 7 | Pleasant Plain | City | 84 |
| 8 | Coppock (mostly in Henry and Washington Counties) | City | 36 |

== See also ==
- National Register of Historic Places listings in Jefferson County, Iowa
