= Buchanan Township, Jefferson County, Iowa =

Township in Iowa, USA

Coordinates: 41°02′N 91°53′W

Buchanan Township is a township in Jefferson County, Iowa, United States.
