= Veo, Iowa =

- former unincorporated community
- Location within Iowa
- Coordinates: 41°09′15″N 91°54′29″W
- Country: United States
- State: Iowa
- County: Jefferson
- Elevation: 745 ft (227 m)
- Time zone: UTC-6 (Central (CST))
  - Summer (DST): UTC-5 (CDT)
- GNIS feature ID: 464308

Veo is a former unincorporated community in northwest Penn Township, Jefferson County, in the U.S. state of Iowa.

== History ==
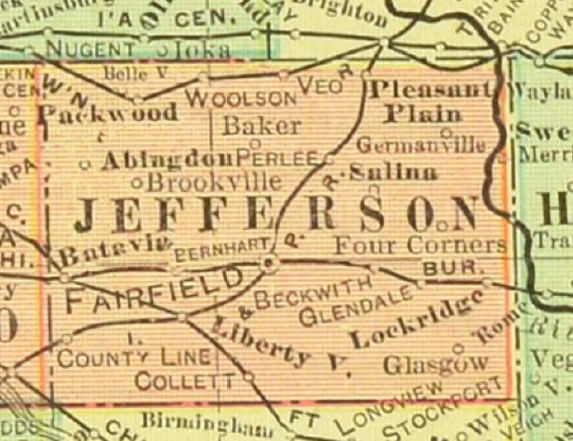
Veo in Jefferson County, Iowa, in 1902

Founded in 1882, Veo was named in honor of V.O. Jones, who operated the first store and railroad depot in the hamlet. The Burlington Western Railroad operated in Veo from that year to 1971.

The population of Veo was 25 in 1902, and was 21 in 1925.

Veo's population was 4 in 1940.

In December 1994, the old railroad depot in Veo was destroyed by a fire.
