= Fairfield, Iowa =

- City
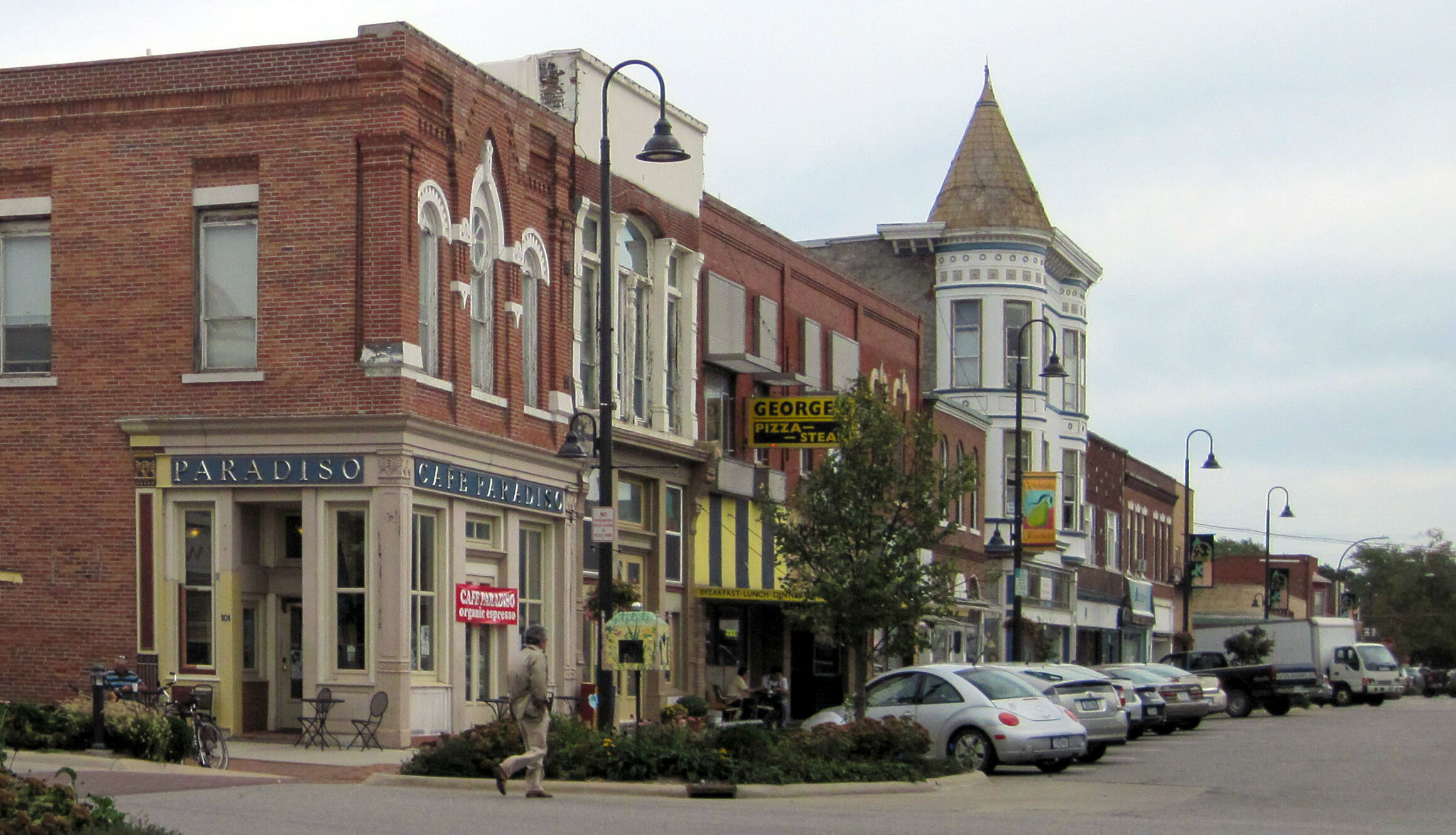
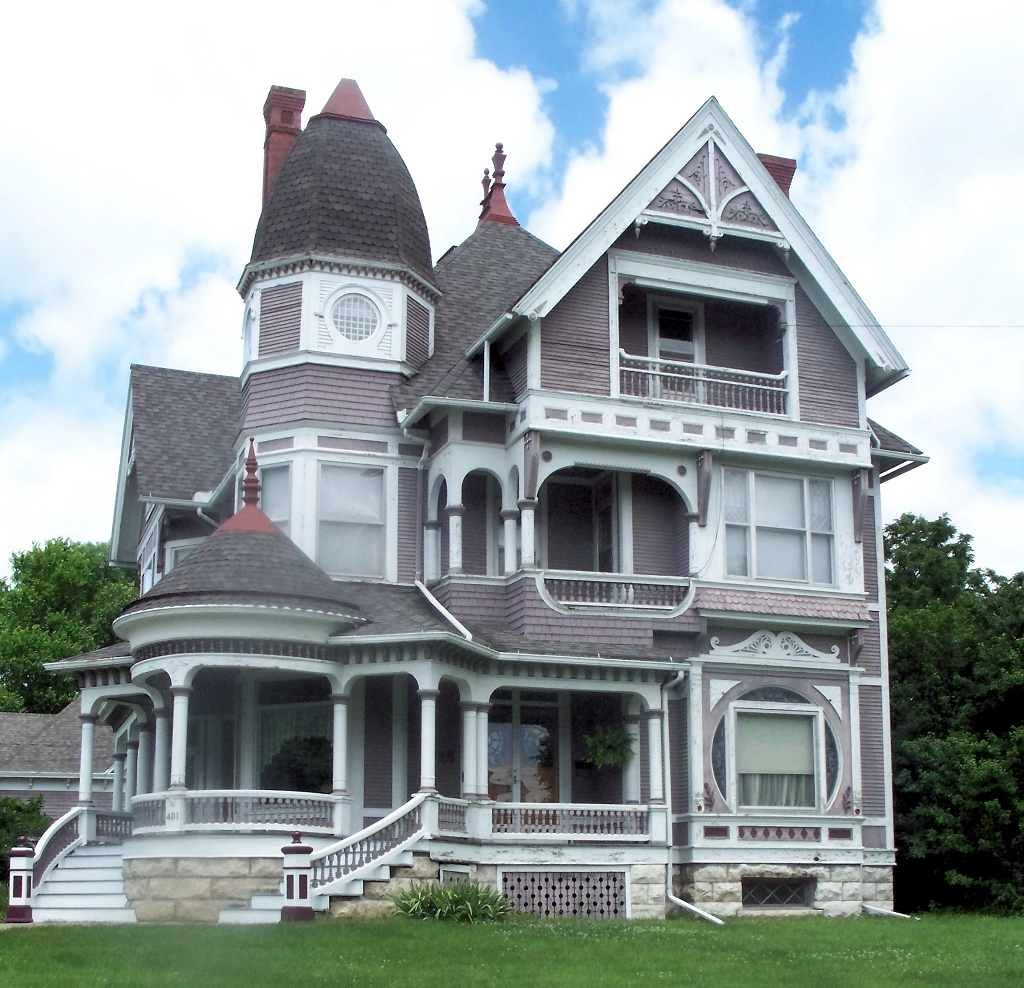
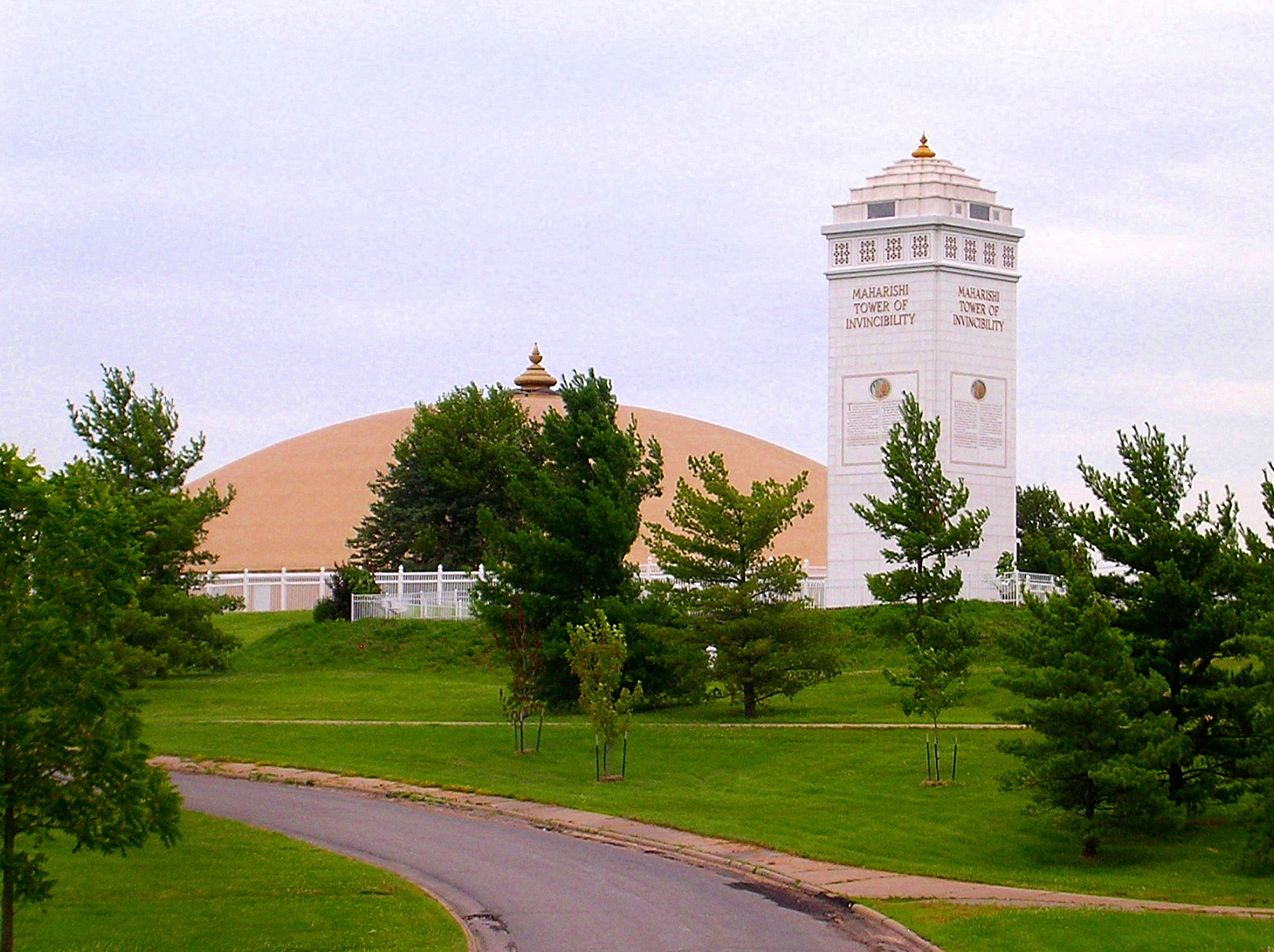
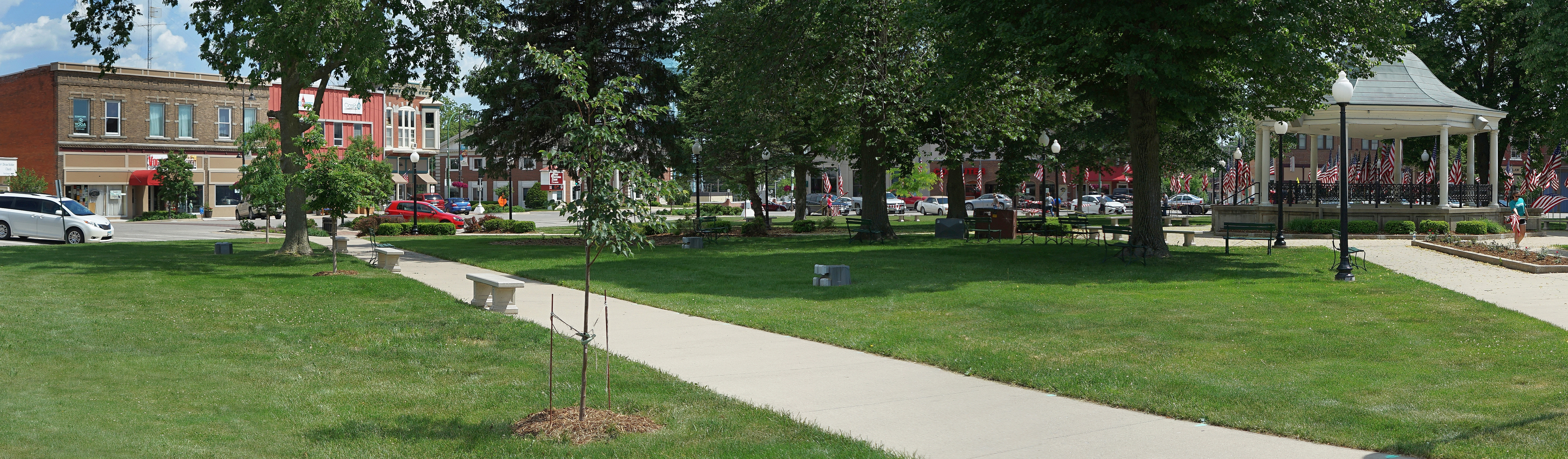
- Historic Downtown Fairfield James A. Beck House Golden Domes at Maharishi International University Fairfield Central Park

- Logo

- Location of Fairfield within Jefferson County and Iowa

- Location in the United States
- Coordinates: 41°00′23″N 91°58′00″W
- Country: United States
- State: Iowa
- County: Jefferson
- Incorporated: May 14, 1875

Area
  - Total: 6.77 sq mi (17.54 km^{2})
  - Land: 6.61 sq mi (17.13 km^{2})
  - Water: 0.16 sq mi (0.41 km^{2})
- Elevation: 774 ft (236 m)

Population (2020)
  - Total: 9,416
  - Density: 1,423.7/sq mi (549.69/km^{2})
- Time zone: UTC−6 (CST)
  - Summer (DST): UTC−5 (CDT)
- ZIP Codes: 52556–52557
- Area code: 641
- FIPS code: 19-26445
- GNIS feature ID: 467811
- Website: cityoffairfieldiowa.com

Fairfield is a city in and the county seat of Jefferson County, Iowa, United States. It has a population of 9,416 people, according to the 2020 census. Fairfield is an international center for Transcendental Meditation, the home of Maharishi International University.

It became the county seat in 1839 with 110 residents and grew to 650 by 1847. Its library was established in 1853, and it held its first fair in 1854. Early architecture in Fairfield includes work by George Franklin Barber and Barry Byrne.

== History ==
The area known as Jefferson County was first settled in 1836 and became Jefferson County in 1839, with the new community of Fairfield as the county seat. The name was suggested by Nancy Bonnifield, one of the settlers, because it aptly described the fair fields of the area. But author Susan Welty suggests it was also a play of words on the woman's own name (bonny field). By 1840, Fairfield had a population of 110 and grew to 650 in 1847. The city was the site of the first and second Iowa State Fairs.

The first fair was held October 25–27, 1854, on 6 acres (2.4 ha) of land surrounded by a 10-foot-high (3.0 m) fence. The total cost to hold the fair was around $320, and public admission was 25 cents per person. It is estimated that between 7,000 and 10,000 fair goers attended this historical event. During the time leading up to the American Civil War, Fairfield was a stopping point for the Underground Railroad. Ultimately, over 1,600 residents of Jefferson County served in the Union Army. Parsons College was founded in 1875. In 1893, the first Carnegie Library west of the Mississippi was completed.

Early architecture in Fairfield includes Victorian houses designed by George Franklin Barber, as well as a 1915 house designed by Barry Byrne, who trained under Frank Lloyd Wright. A 1930s bank building was designed in the Streamline Moderne style. Commercial and institutional architecture were influenced by the Louden Industries, including the Louden Foundry.

Fairfield is the site of the prototype Carnegie library. In 1892, Senator "Jefferson Jim" Wilson met with Andrew Carnegie and secured a grant to build the first community-based library in the U.S. This served as the model for 2,700 libraries worldwide. The Richardsonian Romanesque work is operated by Indian Hills Community College as a satellite campus building, since a new library was built in 1996.

Parsons College later received a grant to build another Carnegie Library. Fairfield became one of the few cities that had two Carnegie Libraries.

== Geography ==
Fairfield's geography is typical of the American Midwest: around the city is rolling farmland specializing in corn, soybeans, cattle and hogs. Running west–east through the city is U.S. Route 34; the city of Burlington is to the east and Ottumwa to the west. Iowa Highway 1 runs from north to south through Fairfield, leading north to Iowa City and south to the Missouri state border.

According to the United States Census Bureau, the city has a total area of 6.42 square miles (16.63 km^{2}), of which 6.26 square miles (16.21 km^{2}) are land and 0.16 square miles (0.41 km^{2}) are water.

=== Climate ===
Climate data for Fairfield, Iowa (1991–2020)
Month	Jan	Feb	Mar	Apr	May	Jun	Jul	Aug	Sep	Oct	Nov	Dec	Year
Mean daily maximum °F (°C)	30.6 (−0.8)	35.6 (2.0)	48.5 (9.2)	61.9 (16.6)	71.3 (21.8)	80.5 (26.9)	84.2 (29.0)	82.6 (28.1)	76.1 (24.5)	62.8 (17.1)	47.8 (8.8)	35.4 (1.9)	59.8 (15.4)
Daily mean °F (°C)	22.1 (−5.5)	26.6 (−3.0)	38.3 (3.5)	50.4 (10.2)	60.5 (15.8)	70.0 (21.1)	73.8 (23.2)	71.9 (22.2)	64.4 (18.0)	52.0 (11.1)	38.7 (3.7)	27.6 (−2.4)	49.7 (9.8)
Mean daily minimum °F (°C)	13.6 (−10.2)	17.7 (−7.9)	28.1 (−2.2)	38.8 (3.8)	49.8 (9.9)	59.5 (15.3)	63.5 (17.5)	61.3 (16.3)	52.8 (11.6)	41.3 (5.2)	29.7 (−1.3)	19.7 (−6.8)	39.7 (4.3)
Average precipitation inches (mm)	1.52 (39)	1.80 (46)	2.40 (61)	3.71 (94)	5.51 (140)	5.11 (130)	3.96 (101)	3.83 (97)	3.58 (91)	3.00 (76)	2.28 (58)	1.72 (44)	38.42 (977)
Average snowfall inches (cm)	6.2 (16)	7.2 (18)	2.7 (6.9)	1.0 (2.5)	0.0 (0.0)	0.0 (0.0)	0.0 (0.0)	0.0 (0.0)	0.0 (0.0)	0.2 (0.51)	0.9 (2.3)	3.5 (8.9)	21.7 (55.11)
Source: NOAA

== Demographics ==
Historical population
Census	Pop.	Note	%±
1850	909		—
1860	1,692		86.1%
1870	2,226		31.6%
1880	3,086		38.6%
1890	3,391		9.9%
1900	4,689		38.3%
1910	4,970		6.0%
1920	5,948		19.7%
1930	6,619		11.3%
1940	6,773		2.3%
1950	7,299		7.8%
1960	8,054		10.3%
1970	8,715		8.2%
1980	9,428		8.2%
1990	9,768		3.6%
2000	9,509		−2.7%
2010	9,464		−0.5%
2020	9,416		−0.5%
U.S. Decennial Census

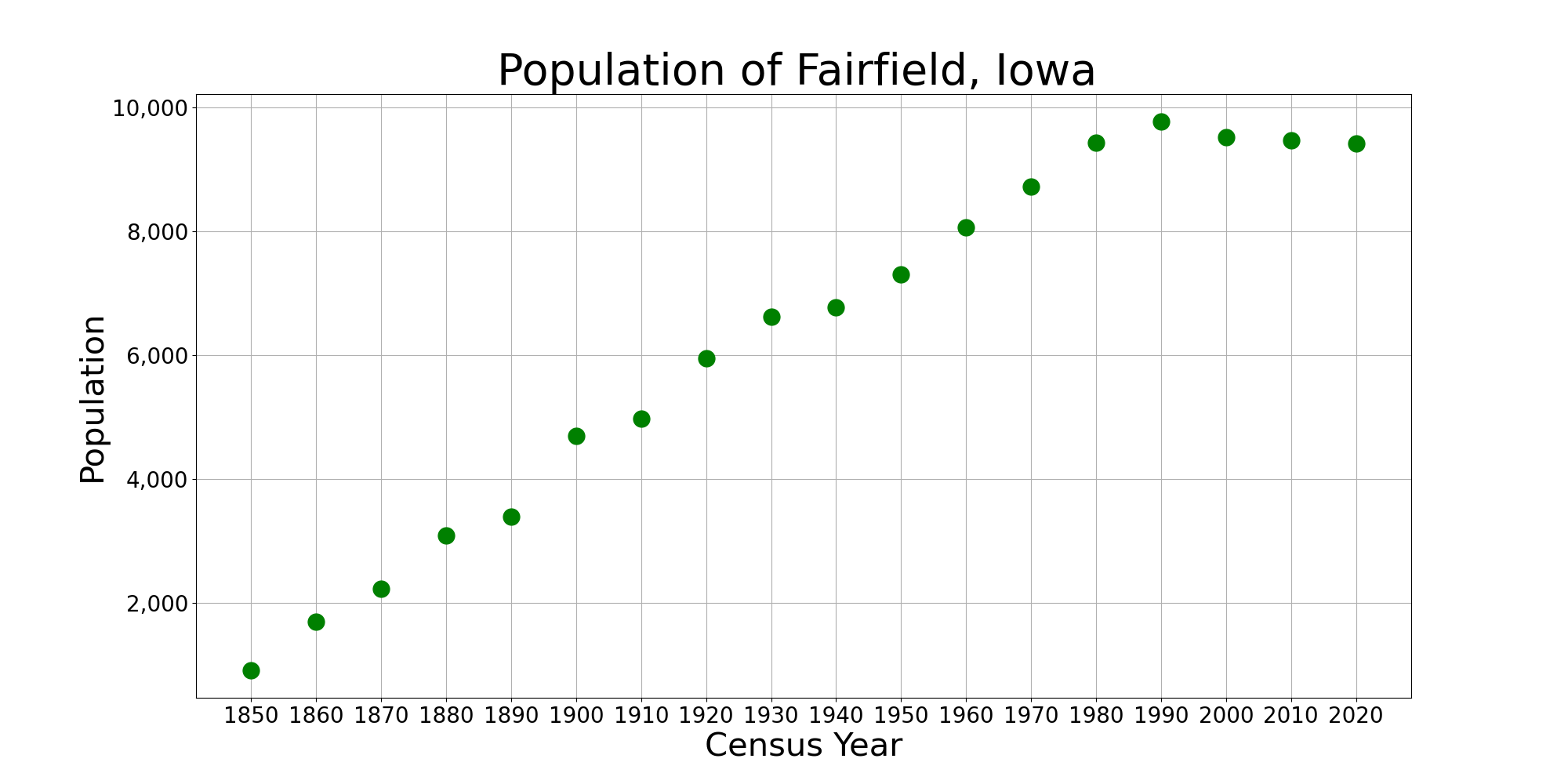
The population of Fairfield, Iowa, from U.S. census data

=== 2020 census ===
As of the 2020 census, Fairfield had a population of 9,416, including 4,275 households and 2,119 families. The population density was 1,423.7 inhabitants per square mile (549.7/km^{2}). There were 4,811 housing units at an average density of 727.4 per square mile (280.9/km^{2}). The median age was 44.3 years. 17.2% of residents were under the age of 18 and 28.4% of residents were 65 years of age or older. 18.9% of residents were under the age of 20; 4.8% were between the ages of 20 and 24; 27.0% were from 25 to 44; and 20.9% were from 45 to 64. The gender makeup of the city was 50.9% male and 49.1% female.

97.2% of residents lived in urban areas, while 2.8% lived in rural areas.

There were 4,275 households, of which 20.5% had children under the age of 18 living in them. Of all households, 35.5% were married-couple households, 6.1% were cohabiting-couple households, 26.3% were households with a male householder and no spouse or partner present, and 32.1% were households with a female householder and no spouse or partner present. About 50.4% of households were non-families, 43.7% of all households were made up of individuals, and 24.2% had someone living alone who was 65 years of age or older.

Of the city's housing units, 11.1% were vacant. The homeowner vacancy rate was 2.7% and the rental vacancy rate was 8.6%.

Racial composition as of the 2020 census
Race	Number	Percent
White	7,655	81.3%
Black or African American	387	4.1%
American Indian and Alaska Native	44	0.5%
Asian	470	5.0%
Native Hawaiian and Other Pacific Islander	5	0.1%
Some other race	254	2.7%
Two or more races	601	6.4%
Hispanic or Latino (of any race)	513	5.4%

=== 2010 census ===
As of the census of 2010, there were 9,464 people, 4,201 households, and 2,218 families residing in the city. The population density was 1,511.8 inhabitants per square mile (583.7/km^{2}). There were 4,650 housing units at an average density of 742.8 per square mile (286.8/km^{2}). The racial makeup of the city was 90.3% White, 2.0% African American, 0.2% Native American, 3.9% Asian, 1.4% from other races, and 2.2% from two or more races. Hispanic or Latino of any race were 3.6% of the population.

There were 4,201 households, of which 23.1% had children under the age of 18 living with them, 39.2% were married couples living together, 10.1% had a female householder with no husband present, 3.5% had a male householder with no wife present, and 47.2% were non-families. 39.7% of all households were made up of individuals, and 12.6% had someone living alone who was 65 years of age or older. The average household size was 2.09 and the average family size was 2.76.

The median age in the city was 46 years. 18.3% of residents were under the age of 18; 8.6% were between the ages of 18 and 24; 21.9% were from 25 to 44; 35.3% were from 45 to 64; and 15.9% were 65 years of age or older. The gender makeup of the city was 49.7% male and 50.3% female.

=== 2000 census ===
As of the census of 2000, there were 9,509 people, 4,063 households, and 2,372 families residing in the city. The population density was 1,657.4 inhabitants per square mile (639.9/km^{2}). There were 4,463 housing units at an average density of 777.9 per square mile (300.3/km^{2}). The racial makeup of the city was 94.35% White, 0.99% African American, 0.16% Native American, 2.53% Asian, 0.03% Pacific Islander, 0.73% from other races, and 1.21% from two or more races. Hispanic or Latino of any race were 2.64% of the population.

There were 4,063 households, out of which 30.0% had children under the age of 18 living with them, 45.2% were married couples living together, 10.1% had a female householder with no husband present, and 41.6% were non-families. 35.9% of all households were made up of individuals, and 12.0% had someone living alone who was 65 years of age or older. The average household size was 2.22 and the average family size was 2.90.

In the city, the population was spread out, with 23.7% under the age of 18, 8.7% from 18 to 24, 23.1% from 25 to 44, 30.9% from 45 to 64, and 13.6% who were 65 years of age or older. The median age was 42 years. For every 100 females, there were 92.7 males. For every 100 females age 18 and over, there were 89.1 males.

The median income for a household in the city was $31,202, and the median income for a family was $46,138. Males had a median income of $34,750 versus $24,830 for females. The per capita income for the city was $19,673. About 10.1% of families and 14.5% of the population were below the poverty line, including 17.7% of those under age 18 and 9.9% of those age 65 or over.

There are 4,437 total housing units in Fairfield, 33.3% were built before 1939, 20.4% between 1940 and 1959, 12.7 between 1960 and 1969, 9.2 between 1970 and 1979, 15.5 between 1980 and 1989, 4.6 between 1990 and 1994, 2.5 between 1995 and 1998, and 1.8 between 1998 and 1999. The median home value in Fairfield is $73,200.

== Economy ==
According to an article in The New York Times, the city "thrives largely on its abundance of start-up companies". Members of the community have established over 400 businesses in areas such as software, manufacturing, and trading. The Agri-Industrial Products company was founded in 1978 and became one of the nation's largest manufacturers of construction warning barrels and other products made of plastic. The city is also home to Creative Edge, a ceramic tile manufacturer.

In 1990, Iowa Governor Terry Branstad called the city "one of the state's economic superstars". A 1997 report said the city had a significant number of entrepreneur businesses including a tofu company, several software firms, a chimney supplies wholesaler, wholefoods grocery store, an oil brokerage, and a telecommunications company. These new companies were reported in 1999 to have "created up to 1,500 jobs in high tech businesses ranging from telecommunications companies to Internet providers to PC-oriented magazines". Later, the city was dubbed "Silicorn Valley" because of the preponderance of new businesses that were Internet and information based, founded by practitioners of the Transcendental Meditation technique.

In the 1990s, Fairfield had an average of $10 million in new construction each year. Some of the construction was in the Maharishi Sthapatya Veda style of architecture and included entrances that face either due east or due north, causing some businesses and homeowners to close their south and west facing entrances. Eco friendly subdivisions that border Fairfield and also use the architectural principles of Maharishi Sthapatya Veda include Cypress Villages, a 145-acre (0.59 km^{2}) development north of the city, and Abundance Ecovillage, an off-the-grid community of 14 homes built in three clusters north of Fairfield. The first LEED Platinum home in the state of Iowa was built nearby in the Cypress Villages Subdivision. Cypress Villages applied to the state for incorporation as it could not be annexed into either Fairfield or Maharishi Vedic City. That request was denied until such time as more services could be offered by the community. In addition, nearby Maharishi Vedic City, located two miles (3 km) north of Fairfield, began as a subdivision and incorporated as a city in 2001. The city sponsors an annual Eco-Fair and has more solar energy homes and green building than any other city in Iowa.

In 2003, a report by the National Center for Small Communities selected Fairfield as a recipient of The Grassroots Rural Entrepreneurship Award, saying that the city "has become recognized as one [of] the nation's most entrepreneurial small towns." The report said that Fairfield had created over 2,000 jobs in the previous 15 years and that new construction averages $10 million per year. That same year, it received the Community Vitality Center's Entrepreneurial Community of the Year award. According to City officials, Fairfield received investments of over $200 million in venture capital from approximately 1990 to 2004. A 2004 National Public Radio report said that over the past 20 years "TM proponents" had created thousands of jobs and more than 200 businesses.

In 2008, the city was the "home of 40 software development and telecom companies" and according to a 2009 report from the University of Iowa's Community Vitality Center, Fairfield has had more than $250 million invested across 50 different companies since 1990. These companies have included various financial services as well as those in marketing, software and telecom. This has created 3000 local jobs, plus "12,000 jobs globally, and nearly $1 billion in new equity".

In 2009, the Fairfield Entrepreneurs Association (FEA) celebrated its 20th year. In 2011, the FEA published the Fairifield Edge magazine that contains profiles of over 40 businesses and organizations and describes the entrepreneurial culture of Fairfield and "asset quilting" to support civic and social entrepreneurship. In 2003, the city began hosting National Rural Entrepreneurial Gatherings, which are now called the FRED Conference (Focus on Rural Entrepreneurial Development). An article in the IEDC Economic Development Journal described Fairfield as a Rural Renaissance City because of its entrepreneurial population.

A 2011 article in The Atlantic reported that newcomers to the town had founded more than 400 new businesses in the fields of marketing, computer programming and manufacturing, including 40 telecom and software companies. The city's largest employer was reported to be the national broker/dealer services firm called Cambridge Investment Research, with about 400 local employees.

== Arts and culture ==
The first library in the state of Iowa was established in Fairfield in 1853, first housed in a rented room off the city square. Fairfield's library became the first Carnegie Library outside of Pennsylvania or Scotland funded by Andrew Carnegie, who donated $40,000 to build the library. The Carnegie building on the corner of Washington and Court streets became the library's home on November 28, 1893. Then in May 1996, the library moved to its location on West Adams Street. The library has over 220,000 items and received accreditation from the State Library of Iowa in 2009.

Fairfield is home to the Fairfield Arts & Convention Center (FACC), a 32,000 sq ft (3,000 m^{2}) building that cost $6 million to build. The complex consists of a 522-seat proscenium theatre, a business pavilion, meeting rooms, executive conference suite, art gallery, commercial kitchen, offices and outdoor plaza. The convention center features 7,700 sq ft (720 m^{2}) of exhibition space and 5,000 sq ft (460 m^{2}) of meeting space. The facility opened on December 7, 2007, with a theater named the Stephen Sondheim Center for the Performing Arts, after the American composer Stephen Sondheim. As the first theater named after Sondheim, its opening production included seven Broadway actors connected with Sondheim's plays. In May 2010, the FACC facility became "essentially" city-owned, following a citywide vote.

On the first Friday night of every month, Fairfield hosts the 1st Fridays Art Walk, which attracts more than 2,500 visitors and showcases local and national artists in downtown galleries and occasional live, outdoor music.

In 2009, a concert by The Beach Boys and The Nadas was held on the Fairfield Middle School grounds, as a benefit for the FACC and the city's Green Sustainability Plan. The concert was sponsored by the David Lynch Foundation. This was the 40th and final performance of The Beach Boys' summer tour of 2009. Fairfield was selected by the Iowa Department of Cultural Affairs to be one of six Iowa Great Places to participate in new program to revitalize the cultural arts in 2010.

Fairfield has been described as an "international center" for Transcendental Meditation; a "national magnet" and "the world's largest training center" for practitioners of the Transcendental Meditation technique. Many of its residents moved there to participate in the group practice of the TM and TM-Sidhi program inside one of the two Golden Domes built in 1981 and 1982 on the Maharishi International University campus. In 2004, National Public Radio reported that "after 30 years, many in Iowa are comfortable with Fairfield's TM community" and a 2008 article in The Wall Street Journal said "natives lived uneasily with the outsiders...but the election of Mr. Malloy [in 2001]... helped ease those tensions".

Author Jack Forem wrote in 2012 that Fairfield is home to one of the largest synagogues in Iowa and one of the largest liberal Catholic Churches in the nation. That year Oprah Winfrey visited Fairfield to interview citizens and was given a tour the town. An account of her visit titled "America's Most Unusual Town", was broadcast in March 2012 via the Oprah Winfrey Network.

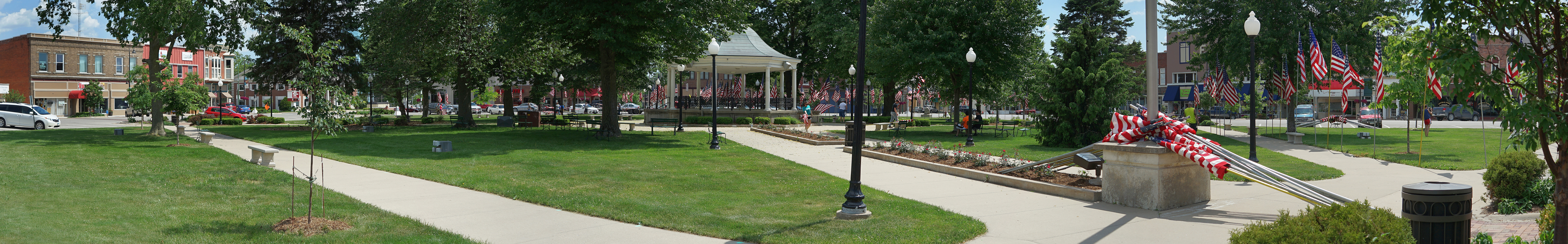
Memorial Day in Central Park

== Parks and recreation ==
Fairfield has 12 public parks and recreation areas consisting of over 1,300 acres (over 5.5 km^{2}) and a "master trail plan" underway that includes a 17-mile (27 km) trail system. Some of the trail is paved, five miles (8 km) of the trail is covered with lime chips, while other areas include traditional wooded paths. The trail system connects several areas of interest, including the Neff Family Wetlands dike, and the BNSF Trail segment, which crosses a new bridge that joins Walton Lake with Chautauqua Park. The final trail plan includes a "heritage path" leading to historical sites and a water trail that connects the area's river and three lakes. In 2012, Fairfield was selected "as one of ten finalists" in the Blue Zones community "small city category" primarily because of its "many walking trails and outdoor activities". In 2015, Fairfield was named a certified Blue Zones Community.

== Government ==
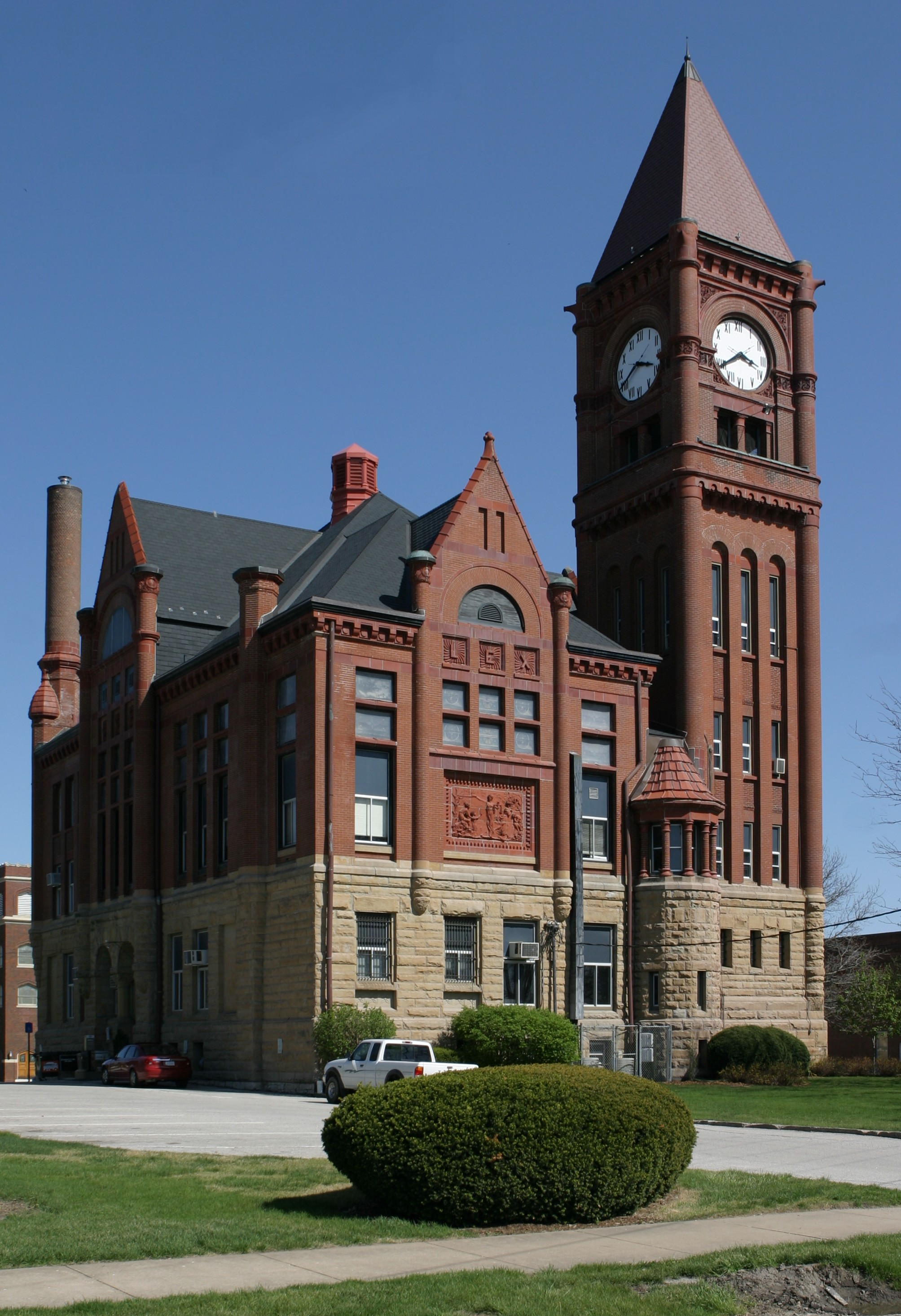
Jefferson County Courthouse in Fairfield

Fairfield is governed by a seven-member city council headed by a mayor. The current mayor, Connie Boyer, was elected in 2019. City council members serve staggered four-year terms. The council consists of one representative from each of the city's five wards, plus two at-large representatives. As of 2024, city council members are Elizabeth Estey (at large), Doug Flournoy (at large), Terri Kness (Ward 1), Paul Gandy (Ward 2), Judy Ham (Ward 3), Matthew Rowe (Ward 4), and Tom Twohill (Ward 5). Fairfield's city administrator is Doug Reinert.

It is part of Iowa House of Representatives District 87, currently represented by Jeff Shipley.

=== Sustainability ===
Fairfield's grassroots efforts to create a sustainable community that focuses on reducing energy and protecting resources have been supported by a position created by Iowa State University extension services and the City of Fairfield.

Former Mayor Malloy described the city's agenda for sustainability as aggressive, and includes a Green Strategic Plan covering everything from conservation, local farms, local food, alternative transportation, and bike paths and trails. In 2009 the city qualified for an $80,000 grant from the state Office of Energy Independence as funding for a sustainability plan scheduled to be completed in 2020. The city was one of 21 locations to receive the state Governor's Environmental Excellence Award in 2013 after it reduced its energy consumption by more than 8% in one year. As of 2013, Fairfield had installed $60,000 worth of solar panels on its public library building and through state and local funding the city had created a $4 million "energy-efficiency loan fund."

== Education ==
The Fairfield Community School District is home to nearly 2,500 students, teachers, administrators and staff, with two elementary schools (Pence Elementary and Washington Elementary), a middle school, and a 3A high school. The high school has approximately 630 students and 75 staff members. The current high school building was built in 1939 on 23.2 acres (9.4 ha). The total cost of the construction was approximately $550,000. In 1984, an addition to the school provided a commons area, new library, new kitchen, a counseling office, and an expansion of the gymnasium. In the 2001–2002 school year, the district added a new transportation building.

In 2010, Lincoln Elementary school was closed due to budget cuts. Also, all fifth grade classes were moved to the Fairfield Middle School. The Fairfield school board voted to use the building for Fairfield High School's alternative school in 2010–11. Fairfield was also home to Fairfield Christian School for a number of years.

Fairfield also has two private schools, Maharishi School (US) and Singing Cedars. The city is home to Maharishi International University (MIU) (formerly Maharishi University of Management [MUM]), a private university that moved to Fairfield in 1974 after purchasing the former campus of Parsons College. Following a national conference held in 1979, about 800 people moved to Fairfield at the urging of MIU's founder.

== Media ==
=== Radio ===
Fairfield has several radio stations, including KHOE 90.5 FM, KKFD-FM 95.9, and KMCD 1570 AM.

=== Television ===
Fairfield's local television station is called FPAC (Fairfield Public Access).

=== Newspaper ===
Fairfield's local newspaper is called the Southeast Iowa Union, which serves Fairfield, Washington, and Mt. Pleasant. In 2024, the Union shifted from five-times-a-week morning newspaper to two times a week (Tuesday and Thursday).

== Infrastructure ==
=== Transportation ===
The nearest commercial airport with jet service is the Eastern Iowa Airport in Cedar Rapids, Iowa, approximately 90 miles (140 km) to the north. The Southeast Iowa Regional Airport near Burlington, Iowa, approximately 50 miles (80 km) to the east offers limited commercial airline service on turboprop aircraft to St. Louis and Chicago. Fairfield has a small airport north of the city, which was built in 1967 and renovated in 2006. The Fairfield Municipal Airport is a general use, public airport. It offers 5,550 feet (1,690 m) of concrete runway. Bus service to Fairfield is provided by Greyhound Lines affiliates Jefferson Lines and Burlington Trailways.

Amtrak carries passengers west–east on the California Zephyr, with passenger stations in Mount Pleasant, (25 miles to the east) and Ottumwa (20 miles to the west). Rail service is by Burlington Northern Santa Fe (BNSF) railway. Locomotives no longer sound their horns within city limits after the city established a railroad Quiet Zone in 2012.

The Rock Island Line also passed through Fairfield, but closed in the late 1970s. The old steel trestle has been removed from its crossing, and the walking trail that circumnavigates the city uses part of the old roadbed.

Evidence of other long-forgotten rail lines can be found in the woods around the city. A section of narrow gauge roadbed can be found cutting its way through Whitham Woods, a park on Fairfield's western edge.

== People ==
- Richard Beymer, actor, resident of Fairfield
- Buddy Biancalana, former Major League Baseball player, resident of Fairfield
- Greg Brown, folk musician, born in Fairfield
- Fannie Brown Patrick, musician and civic leader
- Ben Carter, American actor, born in Fairfield
- Stephen Collins, actor, resident of Fairfield
- Flavia Colgan, political contributor on MSNBC, attended Maharishi High School while her father Kevin Colgan served as Principal.
- Joe Crail, former member of the United States House of Representatives for California, born in Fairfield
- Walter Day, founder of Twin Galaxies, resident of Fairfield
- Dave Despain, sportscaster, born in Fairfield
- Djemba Djemba, multi-platinum record producer, raised in Fairfield
- Ben Foster, actor, raised in Fairfield
- Jon Foster, actor, former resident of Fairfield
- John Hagelin, quantum physicist, three-time United States Presidential candidate, resident of Fairfield
- Milo Hamilton, baseball announcer, born in Fairfield
- Harry Harlow, psychologist, born in Fairfield
- Bernhart Henn, U.S. Congressman, early resident of Fairfield
- Claire Hoffman, journalist, attended school in Fairfield
- Michigan Jake, bass singer, Greg Hollander born in Fairfield. World Champion, Vocal Group Hall of Fame 2001
- John Jackson, gold and bronze medal winner at the 1912 Summer Olympics, resident of Fairfield
- Rebecca J. Keck, 19th century female physician and patent medicine entrepreneur, born in Fairfield
- Orpha Klinker, artist known for her plein air paintings landscapes
- Hugh J. Knerr, major general in the United States Air Force, born in Farifield
- Bob Krause, Iowa, state representative, resident of Fairfield
- Richard L. Lawson, four-star general, born in Fairfield
- Pamela Levy, painter, born in Fairfield
- Eli Lieb, independent singer-songwriter, originally from Fairfield
- Moses A. McCoid, U.S. Representative from Iowa, studied law in Fairfield
- David Rosenboom, composer, born in Fairfield
- Mary Ruthsdotter, feminist activist, born in Fairfield
- Chad Setterstrom, former National Football League player, resident of Fairfield
- Max Steinberg, professional poker player, born in Fairfield
- Matt Stutzman, gold medal winner in archery at the 2024 Summer Paralympics, silver medal winner in archery at the 2012 Summer Paralympics, and holder of the world record for the longest, most accurate shot in archery
- Nick Webster, former British professional soccer player for Wyre Villa, resides in Fairfield
- Hays B. White, Kansas, state politician and lawmaker, born near Fairfield
- James F. Wilson, former United States Senator, resided in Fairfield
- Mehitable E. Woods (1813–1891), hero of the American Civil War
