= Postal =

Postal may refer to:

== Places ==
- The Italian name for Burgstall, South Tyrol in northern Italy
- Postal, Missouri
- Postal Square
- Postal Museum (Liechtenstein), a postal museum in Vaduz, Liechtenstein

== People ==
- Fred Postal, former co-owner of the Washington Senators of the American League
- Paul Postal (born 1936), American linguist

== Arts and entertainment ==
- Postal (franchise), a series of computer games launched in 1997
  - Postal (video game), first entry in the series
  - Postal (film), a 2007 Uwe Boll-directed film based on the Postal computer game
- Postal (comics), a comic book series written by Matt Hawkins and Bryan Hill

== Other uses ==
- Postal code
- Postal service, mail

== See also ==
- Going postal (disambiguation)
- Postal Act (disambiguation)
- Postal Bank (disambiguation)
- Postal abbreviation (disambiguation)
- Postal inspector (disambiguation)
- Postal service (disambiguation)
- Postal strike (disambiguation)
