= Port (disambiguation) =

A port is a facility for receiving ships and transferring cargo.

Port or PORT may also refer to:

== Transportation ==
- Airport, for air transport
- Spaceport, for space vehicles
- Gun port, an opening in the side of the hull of a ship, above the waterline, which allows the muzzle of artillery pieces mounted on the gun deck to fire outside
- Port of entry, where immigration and customs procedures are fulfilled
- Port and starboard, terms for the left and right sides, respectively, of air- or water-craft

== Places ==
=== France ===
- Port, Ain, a commune in France
- Le Port, Ariège, in the Ariège department
- Le Port, Réunion, in the island of Réunion
- Le Port-Marly, in the Yvelines department
- Ports-sur-Vienne, a commune in France

=== Spain ===
- Ports (comarca), a comarca in the Valencian Community, Spain
- Ports de Tortosa-Beseit, a mountain massif at the NE end of the Iberian System

=== Elsewhere ===
- Port, Bern, a commune in Switzerland
- Port, Szczecin, a neighbourhood in Szczecin, Poland
- Port, Templeport, a townland in the parish of Templeport, County Cavan, Ireland
- Porţ, a village in Marca Commune, Sălaj County, Romania
- Port Macquarie, a city in the Australian state of New South Wales
- Porto, second largest city of Portugal

== People ==
- Port (surname)

== Arts, entertainment, and media ==
- Port (film), a 1934 Italian film
- PORT (blog), an arts blog edited by Jeff Jahn
- PORT.hu, a Hungarian database of actors and several performance media
- FM Port, the brand name of Niigata Kenmin FM Broadcast, a defunct radio station in Niigata Prefecture, Japan

== Computing and engineering ==
- Port (circuit theory), a pair of terminals with equal and opposite current flows
- Port (computer networking), a virtual data connection between computer programs
- Port (software), software converted to run on a platform different from the original platform
- Port, exhaust or transfer orifice of a two-stroke engine
- Bass reflex, also known as a reflex port or ported system, a system to increase loudspeaker efficiency
- Computer port (hardware), a physical interface between a computer and other electronic devices
- I/O port, a location in port address space associated with peripheral device
- Ported barrel, a gun barrel with holes drilled into it that are designed to reduce the tendency of the firearm to flip upwards
- Porting (engine), modification of the shape and size of the engine's ports to enhance aerodynamic flow
- Ports collection, part of the package management infrastructure of modern BSD-derived operating systems package management infrastructure of modern BSD-derived operating systems
- Port (company), Israeli software company

== Medicine ==
- Port (medicine), a small medical appliance installed in the body
- PORT Score, a tool for predicting risk of death from pneumonia
- Port is also an informal term for an endoscopy trocar

== Other uses ==
- Port, an Australian term for a schoolbag or, more generally, any type of luggage
- Port wine, a fortified wine (especially when from Portugal)
- Ports 1961, a fashion brand
- Port Adelaide Football Club, a professional Australian rules football club
- Ports Authority F.C., a Sierra Leonean professional football club
- Christopher Newport University, nicknamed Port U.
- Victoria Police Public Order Response Team

== See also ==
- Le Port (disambiguation)
- Port authority (disambiguation)
- Port of Call (disambiguation)
- Porte (disambiguation)
- Old Port (disambiguation)
- Newport (disambiguation)
