= Old Post =

Old Post or similar, may refer to:

- Rural Municipality of Old Post No. 43, Saskatchewan, Canada
- Old Post Cemetery, Fort Huachuca, Arizona, USA
- Boston Post Road, New England, USA; also called "Old Post Road"
  - Old Post Road, Central Park, New York City, New York State, USA
  - Old Post Road, Northford Center Historic District, North Branford, Connecticut, USA

== See also ==
- Musicians of the Old Post Road
- Old Post Office (disambiguation)
- Old Port (disambiguation)
- Post (disambiguation)
- Old (disambiguation)
