= Old Post Office =

Old Post Office, or Former Post Office, may refer to:

== Serbia ==
- Old Post Office (Belgrade)

== United Kingdom ==
- Old Post Office, Bristol
- Tintagel Old Post Office, Tintagel

== United States ==
- Old Athens, Alabama Main Post Office in Athens, Alabama
- Old Brick Post Office in Wickenburg, Arizona
- Old Camden Post Office in Camden, Arkansas
- Old Post Office (Fayetteville, Arkansas)
- Old Post Office (Hot Springs, Arkansas)
- Little Rock U.S. Post Office and Courthouse, also known as the Old Post Office and Courthouse, Little Rock, Arkansas
- Old Post Office (Mena, Arkansas)
- Old Post Office (Santa Rosa, California)
- Old Post Office Building (Washington, D.C.), District of Columbia
- Old Eau Gallie Post Office, in Eau Gallie, Florida
- Old Fort Pierce Post Office, in Fort Pierce, Florida
- Old Post Office and Customshouse (Key West, Florida)
- Old U.S. Post Office and Federal Building (Macon, Georgia)
- Old Chicago Main Post Office, Chicago, Illinois
- Former US Post Office Building (Fairfield, Iowa)
- Old Post Office (Iowa City, Iowa)
- Old United States Courthouse and Post Office (Frankfort, Kentucky), NRHP-listed
- Old U.S. Customshouse and Post Office and Fireproof Storage Company Warehouse, in Louisville, Kentucky
- Old Post Office (Baton Rouge, Louisiana)
- Old Post Office (Augusta, Maine)
- Old Post Office (Liberty, Maine)
- Old Post Office Building (Brockton, Massachusetts)
- Old Post Office Building (Lynn, Massachusetts)
- Old US Post Office (Philadelphia, Mississippi)
- Old Post Office (Omaha, Nebraska), a former building in Omaha, Nebraska
- Old Post Office (Concord, New Hampshire)
- Old Post Office Block, in Manchester, New Hampshire
- Old Post Office (Albuquerque, New Mexico)
- Old Clovis Post Office in Clovis, New Mexico
- Old Las Vegas Post Office in Las Vegas, NM, listed on the NRHP in New Mexico
- Old Post Office (Albany, New York)
- United States Post Office, Former, and Federal Courthouse (Auburn, New York), NRHP-listed
- Old Post Office (Buffalo, New York), formerly the tallest building in Buffalo
- Old Post Office (Oneonta, New York)
- Former US Post Office (Belmont, North Carolina)
- Former US Post Office (Mount Olive, North Carolina)
- Former US Post Office (Smithfield, North Carolina)
- Former US Post Office Building (Waynesville, North Carolina)
- Post Office (Christine, North Dakota), known also as Old Post Office, in Richland County
- Old Akron Post Office, listed on the National Register of Historic Places listings in Ohio
- Old College Hill Post Office in Cincinnati, Ohio
- Howard M. Metzenbaum United States Courthouse, Cleveland, Ohio, NRHP-listed, as "Old Federal Building and Post Office"
- United States Post Office and Courthouse (Columbus, Ohio), NRHP-listed
- Old Post Office and Federal Building (Dayton, Ohio), in Dayton, Ohio, listed on the NRHP in Ohio
- Franklin Post Office, in Franklin, Ohio, as "Old Log Post Office"
- Old Central Post Office in Toledo, Ohio, listed on the NRHP in Ohio
- Old Post Office (Watertown, South Dakota), as "Watertown Post Office"
- Old Post Office (Chattanooga, Tennessee), listed on the NRHP in Tennessee
- Old Post Office Building (Knoxville, Tennessee)
- Old U.S. Post Office and Courts Building (Jefferson, Texas)
- Old Federal Building and Post Office (Victoria, Texas), National Register of Historic Places listings in Victoria County, Texas
- Old Post Office (Washington, D.C.), as "Old Post Office and Clock Tower"
- Old Post Office (Pullman, Washington), as "U.S. Post Office-Pullman"
- Old Morgantown Post Office, part of the Monongalia Arts Center in Morgantown, West Virginia, NRHP-listed
- Old Ashland Post Office, Wisconsin
- Former United States Post Office (Kaukauna, Wisconsin), listed on the NRHP in Wisconsin

== See also ==
- Post office
- Postal service
- List of United States post offices
- Federal Building and Post Office (disambiguation)
- U.S. Post Office and Courthouse (disambiguation)
- Postal service (disambiguation)
- Post Office (disambiguation)
- Old Post (disambiguation)
