= Going postal (disambiguation) =

Going postal is the state of becoming uncontrollably angry, often to the point of violence.

Going postal may also refer to:

- Going Postal, a 2004 novel by Terry Pratchett
  - Terry Pratchett's Going Postal, a 2010 television adaptation of the novel
- Going Postal: Rage, Murder, and Rebellion: From Reagan's Workplaces to Clinton's Columbine and Beyond, a 2005 book by Mark Ames
- Going Postal: More Than 'Yes' or 'No', edited by Son Vivienne and Quinn Eades, a 2018 collection of writing about the impact of the 2017 Australian Marriage Law Postal Survey
- Going Postal (Heroes), a 2008 web-based spinoff from the television series Heroes

== See also ==
- Gone Postal (band)
- Postal (video game)
