= Palazzo delle Poste =

Palazzo delle Poste may refer to the following buildings:

- Palazzo delle Poste, Catania
- Palazzo delle Poste, Grosseto
- Palazzo delle Poste, Naples
- Palazzo delle Poste, Palermo

== See also ==
- Post Office (disambiguation)
