= Portes =

Portes may refer to:

== Places ==
=== France ===
- Antheuil-Portes, in the Oise department
- Les Portes-en-Ré, in the Charente-Maritime département
- Portes-en-Valdaine, in the Drôme département
- Portes, Eure, in the Eure département
- Portes, Gard, in the Gard département
- Portes-lès-Valence, in the Drôme département
- Charterhouse of Portes, Bénonces, Ain; the third oldest Carthusian monastery

=== Greece ===
- Portes, Achaea, a village in the southwestern part of Achaea
- Portes, Aegina, a village on the island of Aegina
- Portes, Arcadia, a village in Arcadia
- Portes, Chalkidiki, a village in the municipality Nea Propontida, Chalkidiki
- Portes islets off Paros, site of the MS Express Samina disaster
- Portes (game), one of 3 sub-games in the Greek tables game of Tavli

== People ==
- Alain Portes (born 1961), French handball player
- Alejandro Portes, Cuban-American sociologist
- Andrea Portes, American novelist
- Gil Portes, Filipino filmmaker
- Jonathan Portes (born 1966), British-American economist, son of Richard
- Pascal Portes (born 1959), French tennis player
- Richard Portes (born 1941), American-British economist
- Thomas Portes (born 1985), French politician

== See also ==
- Porte (disambiguation)
