= Old Port =

Old Port is a name used by historic port districts in several jurisdictions.

Old Port or Oldport may refer to:

== Historic port districts ==
- Oldport of Berlin Charter Township, Michigan, United States
- The Port, Cambridge, Massachusetts, United States; also called the "Old Port", a neighborhood built atop an infilled former port
- Old Port of Genoa, Genoa, Italy
- Old Port of Limassol, Limassol, Cyprus; a historic port district
- Old Port of Marseille. Marseille, France; a historic port district
- Old Port of Montreal, Montreal, Quebec, Canada; a historic port district
- Old Port, Port of Quebec, Quebec City, Quebec, Canada; a historic port district
- Old Port of Portland, Maine, United States; a historic port district
- Puerto Viejo (Spanish: Old Port), Cerro Azul, Peru; a historic port district
- The old location of Newport, Tennessee

== Other uses ==
- Old Port Formation, Pennsylvania, United States; a geological rock formation
- Old Port, Port Royal, Pennsylvania, United States; a village formerly called Saint Tammany, that was renamed when the Port Royal post office in Saint Tammany was moved to Perrysville, and the district was renamed to Port Royal
- Old Port Pacification Superintendency, a client state of Ming dynasty, located in today's Indonesia

== See also ==
- Old Port of Montreal Corporation
- Old Port Pacification Superintendency
- Any Old Port!, 1932 comedy short film
- Any Old Port in a Storm, 1908 song
- Old Post (disambiguation)
- Newport (disambiguation), including "New Port"
- Port (disambiguation)
- Old (disambiguation)
