= Le Port =

Le Port is the name or part of the name of several communes in France:

- Le Port, Ariège, in the Ariège département
- Le Port, Réunion, in the island of Réunion
- Le Port-Marly, in the Yvelines département

It may also refer to:

- Le Port (painting), also known as The Harbor or Marine, by Jean Metzinger

== See also ==
- Port (disambiguation)
