= Post Office (disambiguation) =

A post office is a facility that is part of a postal network.

Post Office may also refer to several national postal services, including:

- General Post Office, the former English and British postal service
- Post Office Limited, retail post office company in the United Kingdom
- United States Post Office Department, the former U.S. postal service
- United States Postal Service, the present U.S. postal service
- Canada Post, the present Canadian postal service

It may also refer to:

- St Paul's tube station, originally known as Post Office from its position near the GPO East
- Post office (game), a kissing game played by boys and girls
- The Post Office (play), a 1912 play by Rabindranath Tagore
- Post Office (short story), a 1923 short story by Dhumketu
- Post Office (novel), a 1971 novel by Charles Bukowski
- The Post Office (painting), an 1819 painting by Edward Villiers Rippingille
- "Post Office" (2 Stupid Dogs), an episode of 2 Stupid Dogs

== See also ==
- Postal service (disambiguation)
- General Post Office (disambiguation)
- Central Post Office (disambiguation)
- Old Post Office (disambiguation)
- Post (disambiguation)
- Palazzo delle Poste (disambiguation)
