= Port authority (disambiguation) =

A port authority is a governmental or quasi-governmental body that operates ports and other transportation infrastructure.

Port Authority may also refer to:

- Port Authority (album), a 2007 album by hip hop producer Marco Polo
- Port Authority (film), a 2019 American film
- Port Authority (play), a 2001 play by Conor McPherson
- Port Authority Bus Terminal, the main terminal for interstate buses in New York City
- Ports Authority F.C., a professional football team in Freetown, Sierra Leone
- Port Authority of Allegheny County, former name of a public transit authority in Pittsburgh
- Port Authority of New York and New Jersey, a two-state port district established in 1921

== See also ==
- Port (disambiguation)
