= Porte =

Porte may refer to:

- Sublime Porte, the central government of the Ottoman empire
- Porte, Piedmont, a municipality in the Piedmont region of Italy
- John Cyril Porte, British/Irish aviator
- Richie Porte, Australian professional cyclist who competes for Team BMC
- Toyota Porte, an automobile

== See also ==
- Port (disambiguation)
- Portes (disambiguation)
