= Historic properties in Fort Huachuca National Historic District =

Fort Huachuca National Historic District
- Sierra Vista, Arizona
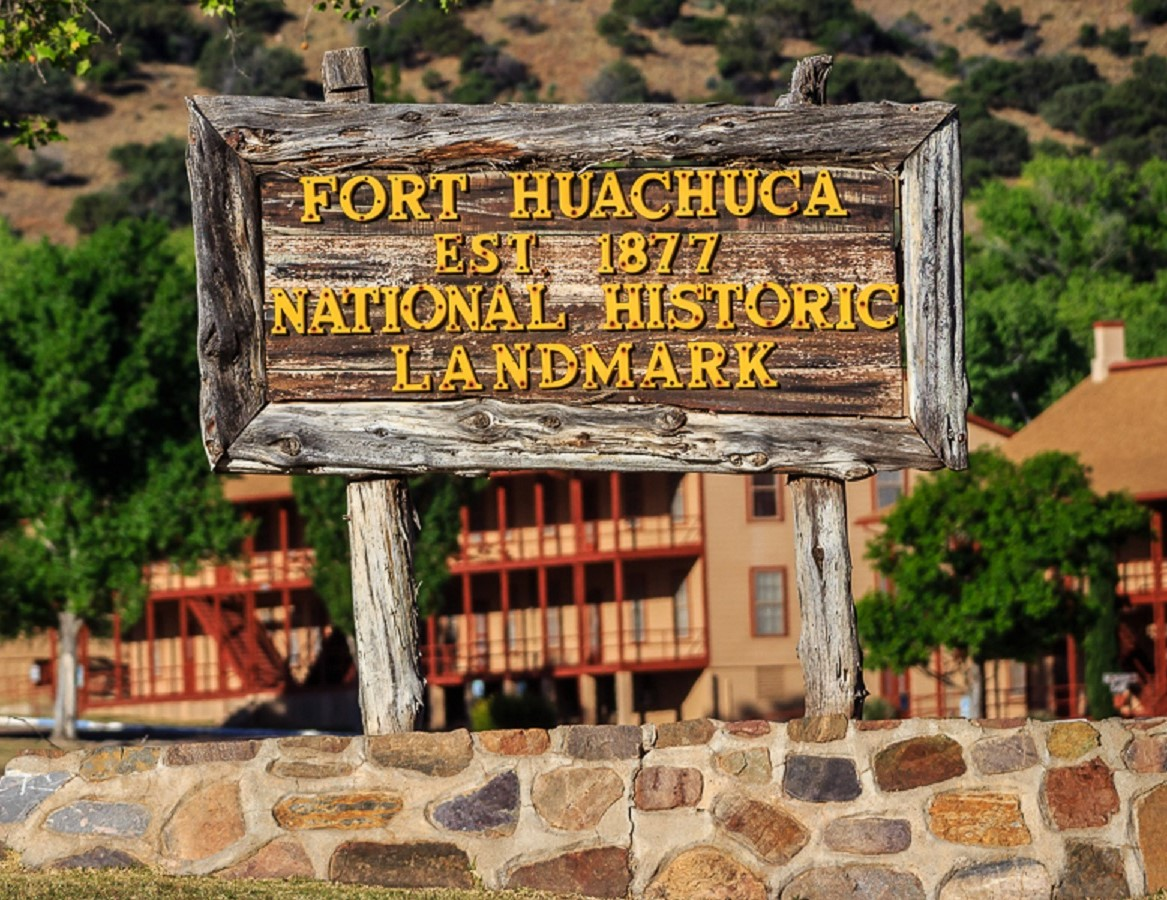
- Landmark sign on the Brown Parade Field in the historic district of Fort Huachuca

Site information
- Type: Army Post

Location
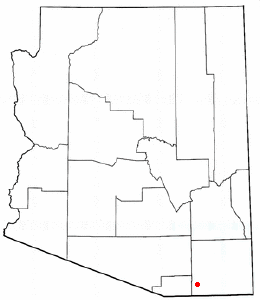
- Location of Fort Huachuca, Arizona.
- Coordinates: 31°33′19″N 110°20′59″W

This is a list with images of some of the historic structures and places in the Fort Huachuca National Historic District in Arizona. The district, also known as Old Fort Huachuca, is located within Fort Huachuca an active United States Army installation under the command of the United States Army Installation Management Command. The fort sits at the base of the Huachuca Mountains four miles west of the town of Sierra Vista, on AZ 90 in Cochise County, Arizona.

During the Apache Wars General Nelson A. Miles used Fort Huachuca as his headquarters until the surrender of Geronimo in 1886. In 1913, the fort became the base for the 10th Cavalry Regiment also known as the "Buffalo Soldiers", which was composed of African Americans. General John Pershing used the fort as a forward logistics and supply base from 1916 to 1917 in his expedition against Pancho Villa and his men, The fort was once commanded by Charles Young, the first African American to be promoted to colonel. Fort Huachuca was declared a National Historic Landmark in 1977.

== Brief early history ==
The Clovis people, were hunters of the now-extinct mammoth and other large game. They lived in the area 13,000 years ago. According to archaeologists, the area where the fort is located, was Inhabited since link CE by various Native-American tribes. Among those tribes were the Hohokam, Mogollon and the Trincheras. Apache pictographs from the 1700s were also discovered.

In 1540, Francisco Vázquez de Coronado led an expedition and passed through the area in search of transportable riches, rumored to be in the "Seven Cities of Cibola". Coronado and his men were the first Europeans to explore the area, however the "Seven Cities of Cibola", whose structures were supposed to be made of gold, was only a myth.

Father Kino, the traveling Padre of the Southwest, passed through this area in 1699. Father Kino was a Jesuit, missionary, geographer, explorer, cartographer and astronomer who established many missions in the Southwest.

The area became part of Mexico in 1821, when Mexico fought for and gained its independence from Spain. In 1854, it ceased to be part of Mexico and became a United States Territory (New Mexico Territory). In 1863, Arizona became an official United States territory as a result of Gadsden Purchase.

== Camp Huachuca ==
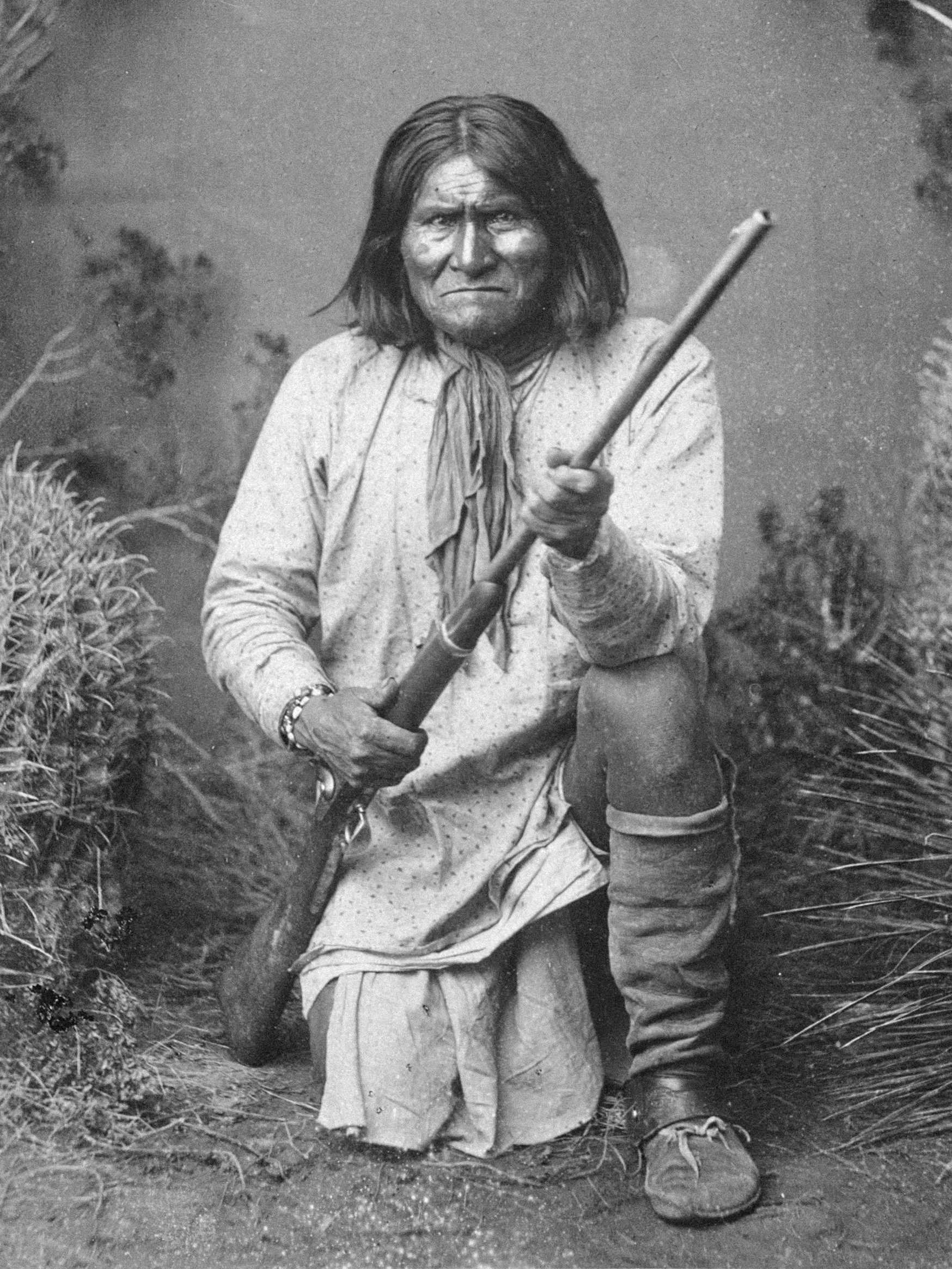
Geronimo

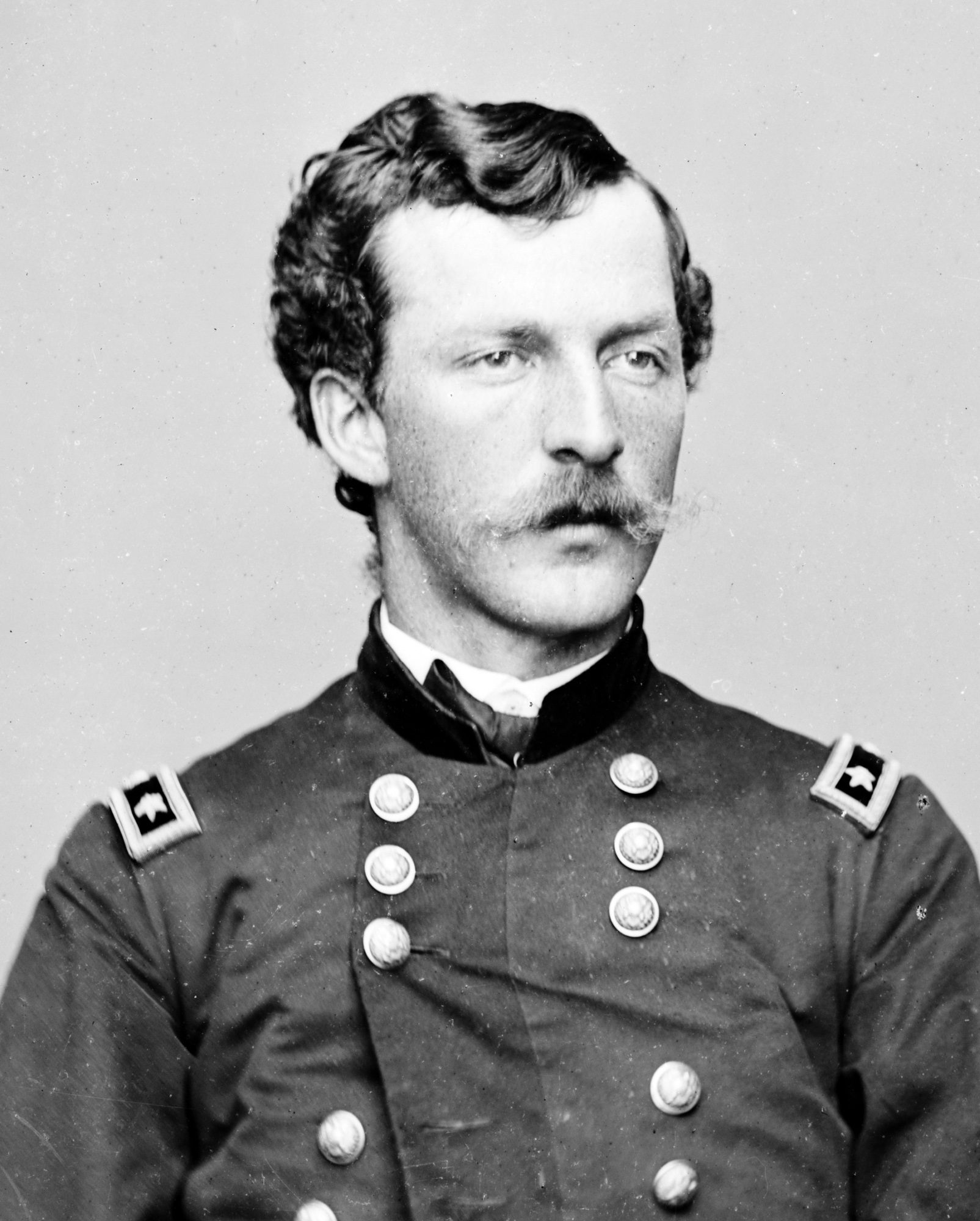
Nelson A. Miles

After gold was discovered in California, pioneers of European heritage from the east coast of the United States, began to migrate to the West and Southwestern territories of the United States. Many of these pioneers settled in Arizona and some established travel routes by the area close to where the fort currently stands. The early settlers and travelers were under constant attack by the Chiricahua Apaches who would proceed to escape to sanctuary in Mexico via the routes through the San Pedro and Santa Cruz valleys.

Geronimo was a Chiricahua Apache who became a leader during the Apache Wars. On one occasion when Geronimo was 28 years old, he was away from his camp with the rest of the male Apache warriors. When they returned they saw that many of the women and children had been slaughtered, including Geronimo's mother, wife and three of his children. This incident set him on the path of fighting against the colonizing forces that sought to control and oppress the Apache and take their lands.

In February 1877, Col. August V. Kautz, commander of the Department of Arizona, ordered that a camp be established in the Huachuca Mountains. The Huachuca Mountains, whose name means "place of thunder", was named as such by the Native-Americans. Camp Huachuca was designated a fort and renamed as such in 1882.

In 1886, Gen. Nelson A. Miles designated Fort Huachuca as his advance headquarters and forward supply base for the Geronimo campaign. In 1886, Miles replaced General George Crook as commander of the forces fighting against Geronimo, Miles relied on white troops, who eventually traveled 3,000 miles (4,800 km) without success as they tracked Geronimo through the tortuous Sierra Madre Mountains. First Lieutenant Charles B. Gatewood, who had studied Apache ways, succeeded in negotiating a surrender, under the terms of which Geronimo and his followers agreed to spend two years on a Florida reservation. Geronimo agreed on these terms, being unaware of the real plot behind the negotiations (that there was no intent to let them go back to their native lands). The exile included even the Chiricahuas who had worked for the army, in violation of Miles' agreement with them. Miles denied Gatewood any credit for the negotiations and had him transferred to the Dakota Territory.

== Buffalo Soldiers ==
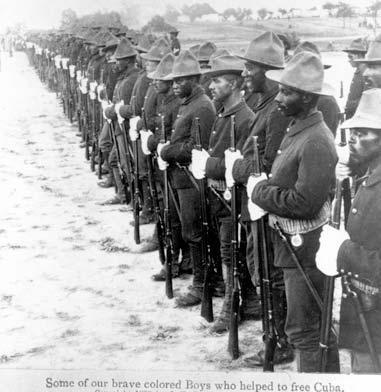
10th Cavalry Regiment "Buffalo Soldiers

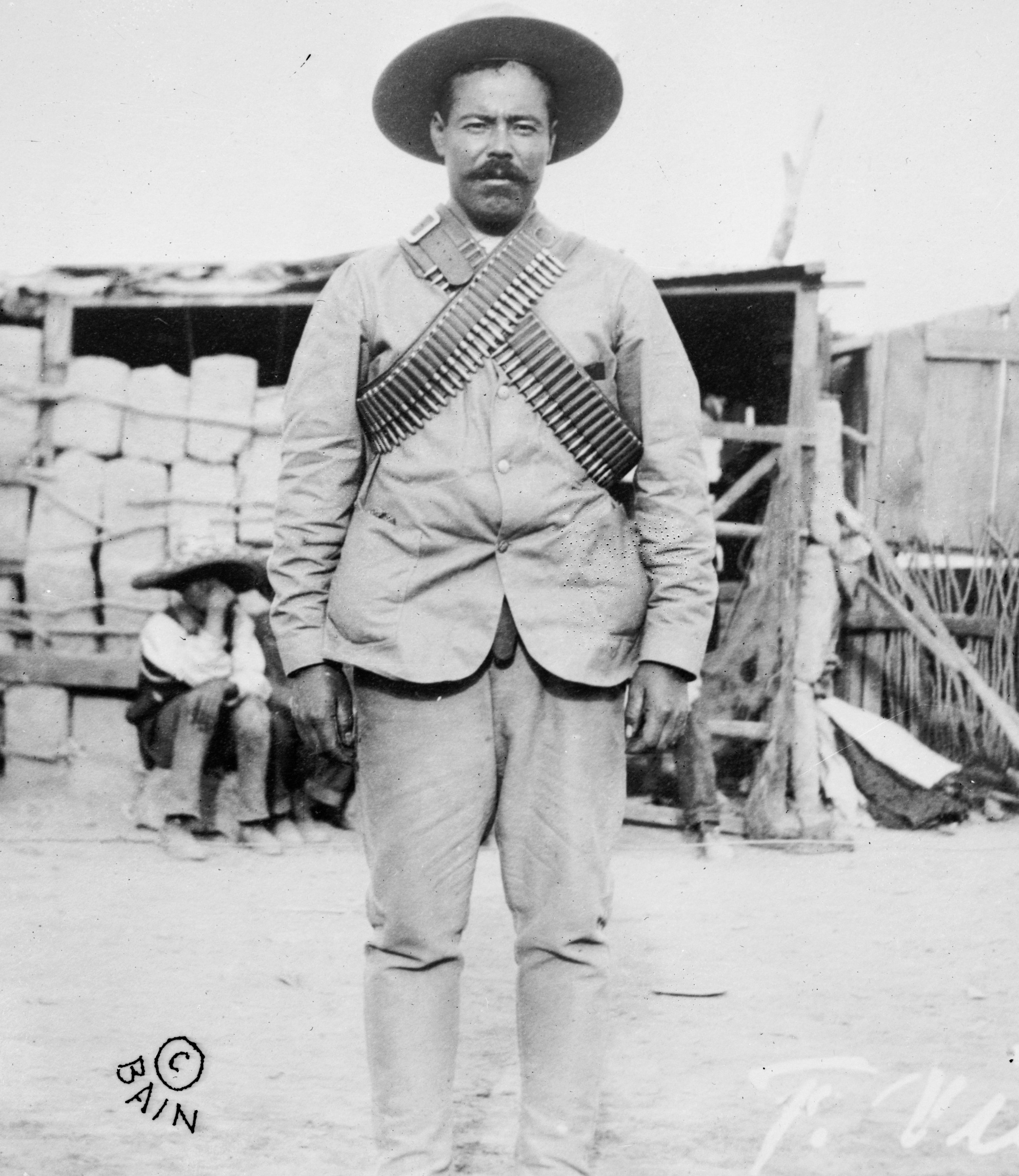
Pancho Villa

After the surrender of Geronimo, trouble continued to brew with renegade Native-Americans, Mexican bandits; especially with the followers of Pancho Villa, and American outlaws and freebooters. In 1913, Fort Huachuca became the base for the 10th Cavalry Regiment "Buffalo Soldiers", which was composed of African Americans. The 10th Cavalry continued to fight the Apaches after Geronimo's surrender in 1886. A detachment of 10th Cavalry fought one of their last battles of the Apache Wars north of Globe at the Salt River during an expedition on March 7, 1890. After the battle Sergeant William McBryar, was awarded the Medal of Honor for his actions during the pursuit of the Apache warriors.

General John Pershing used the fort as a forward logistics and supply base from 1916 to 1917 in his expedition against Pancho Villa and his men. Pershing sent the 10th Cavalry in pursuit of Villa and his men. Then-Major Charles Young, an African-American, commanded a squadron of the 10th Cavalry during the “Punitive Expedition” into Mexico. In Mexico they were confronted by peasants with pro Villa sympathies. The authorities in Mexico considered it a disgrace if Villa was captured by the Americans and therefore provided misleading information which resulted in the failure of Pershing's Villa campaign.

Upon his return from Mexico, then-Lieutenant Colonel Young established a school for African American enlisted men at Fort Huachuca, Arizona. He foresaw the coming of future wars and was determined that men of his race would be prepared to enter an officers’ training camp if one should be established. Young, was the first African American to be promoted to colonel. In September 1916, he became the commander of Fort Huachuca.

== The Old Post Cemetery ==
The historic Old Post Cemetery was established in 1877 on the southwest corner of Grierson and Mizner Avenues. The cemetery was moved to its present location on May 18, 1883. Buried are many of the soldiers who perished during the Apache Wars including Apache Scouts and their families. There are over 4,124 U.S. Military Personnel buried in the cemetery. Among the buried are Apache Scout Shorten Bread, one of the Apache Scouts of General George Crook who helped to track Geronimo, and his son Shorten Bread Jr. Miss Carrie A. Clark, who served as postmistress, is also buried there. Also buried in the cemetery is Colonel Louis A. Carter, the only African-American chaplain, who served with all four of the black regiments of the Regular Army. Carter was the second African-American Army chaplain to be promoted to colonel. At Fort Huachuca, he served as post chaplain from 1913 to 1915 and again from 1935 to 1940. There are some unmarked graves outside the cemetery's wall. Criminals were prevented from being buried within the cemetery itself. The "Mourning Hearts, A Soldier's Family", a bronze sculpture by Jessica McCain and presented by the Huachuca Museum Society in 1996, is situated inside the cemetery. The statue depicts a nameless woman and children mourning the loss of her husband, a Soldier with a backdrop of gravestones. The address of the 7.3 acre cemetery is 104 Burt Road.

== Currently ==
The historic district, which was designated a National Historic Landmark in 1977, is located within Fort Huachuca an active United States Army installation under the command of the United States Army Installation Management Command.

== Historic properties pictured ==
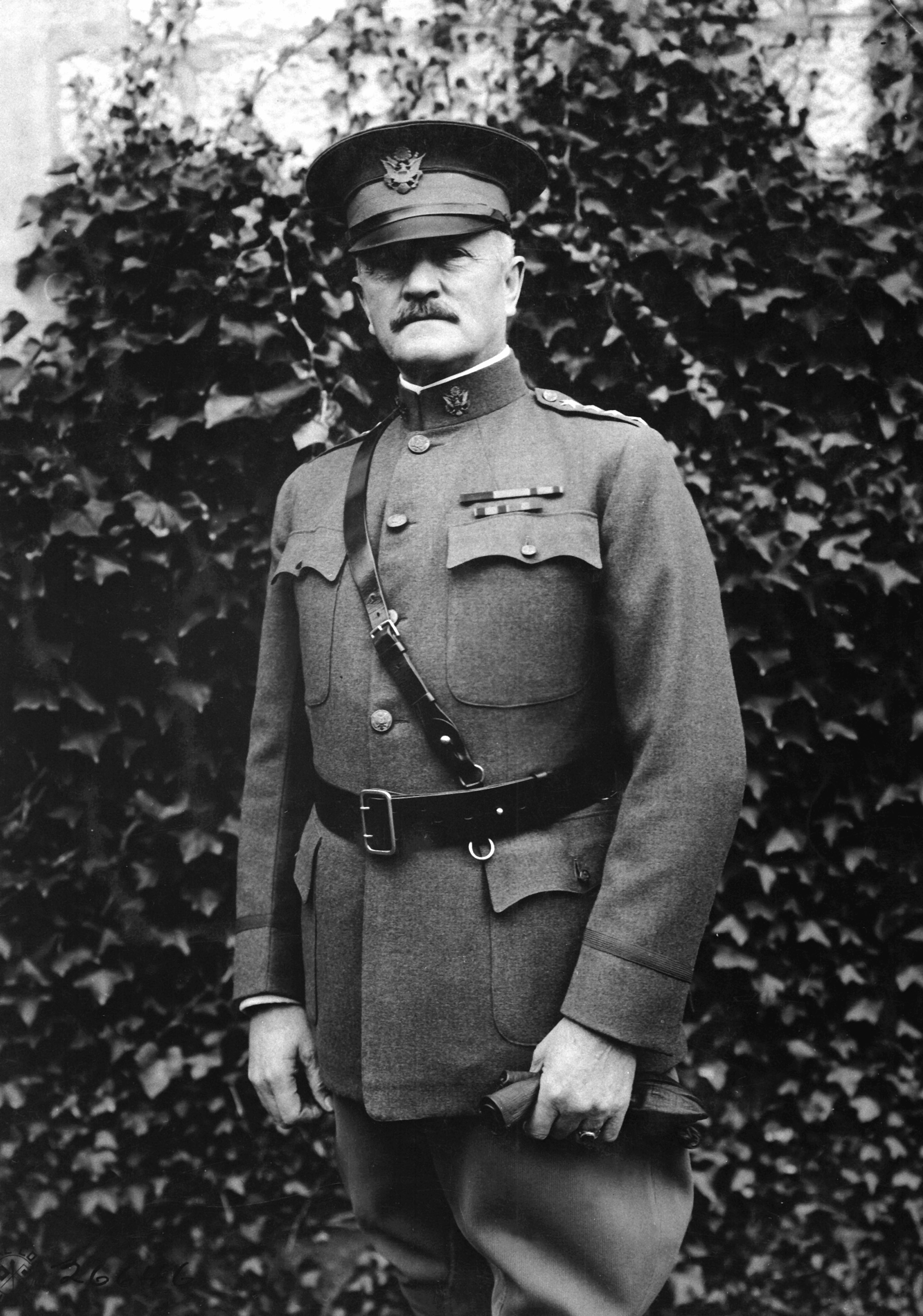
John J. Pershing

The historic properties, places and items pictured are the following:

- The Pershing House – Built in 1884. General John J. Pershing, stayed in this house, named in is honor, in 1922.
- The Original Fort Headquarters – Built in 1880, Now the Fort Huachuca Museum. The Fort Huachuca Museum opened in 1960 and serves the Fort by collecting, preserving and exhibiting artifacts representing its own history and the larger history of the military in the Southwest.
- The Old Post Barracks – Built in 1883. They were constructed as double barracks. The four buildings are now used as administration buildings and each is named after a cavalry unit which was once stationed in the old fort Huachuca. The names are: 6th Cavalry Hall (22208), 4th Cavalry Hall (22214), lOth Cavalry Hall (22216), and 5th Cavalry Hall (22320).
- The Leonard Wood Hall – Built in 1885. A large two-storied building used as the hospital. The building was named after Major General Leonard Wood, Medal of Honor recipient and Chief of Staff of the Army from 1910 to 1914.
- The Ordnance Warehouse – Built in 1882. In the 1930s, the building served as Salvador Sepulveda's shoe repair shop.
- The Hangman's Warehouse – Built in 1880. The Hangman's Warehouse is mainly remembered for the execution of two murderers in the 1940s. In 1942, Private James Rowe stabbed a fellow soldier to death in a dispute over stolen cigarettes. One year later, Staff Sergeant Jerry Sykes murdered a woman with whom he had been having an affair. Both were hanged for their crimes beneath the side windows of the warehouse.
- Rodney Hall – Built in 1917. Now Military Intelligence Branch headquarters. Colonel George B. Rodney, who once commanded Fort Huachuca, was the first occupant of this structure. Rodney was to command 10th Cavalry during World War I.
- Sam Kee Hall – Built in 1885. The Hall is now used by a headquarters staff element. It is named after Sam Kee, who first opened a post concession in 1881.
- The Buffalo Soldier Legacy Plaza – Dedicated on April 23, 2009.
- A Parrott Rifle – An 1861 cannon, also known as the “Parrott Gun.”, in the Brown Parade Field which once used in the Apache Wars
- The Old Fort Cemetery – Established in 1877. Its first burial was Private F.P. Kelly of the 6th US Cavalry Regiment, who died on December 22, 1877. Colonel Louis A. Carter, the only African-American chaplain, who served with all four of the black regiments of the Regular Army, is buried there.
- The Mourning Hearts Statue – Dedicated in 1996 to the wives who lost their husbands in service.
Fort Huachuca National Historic District

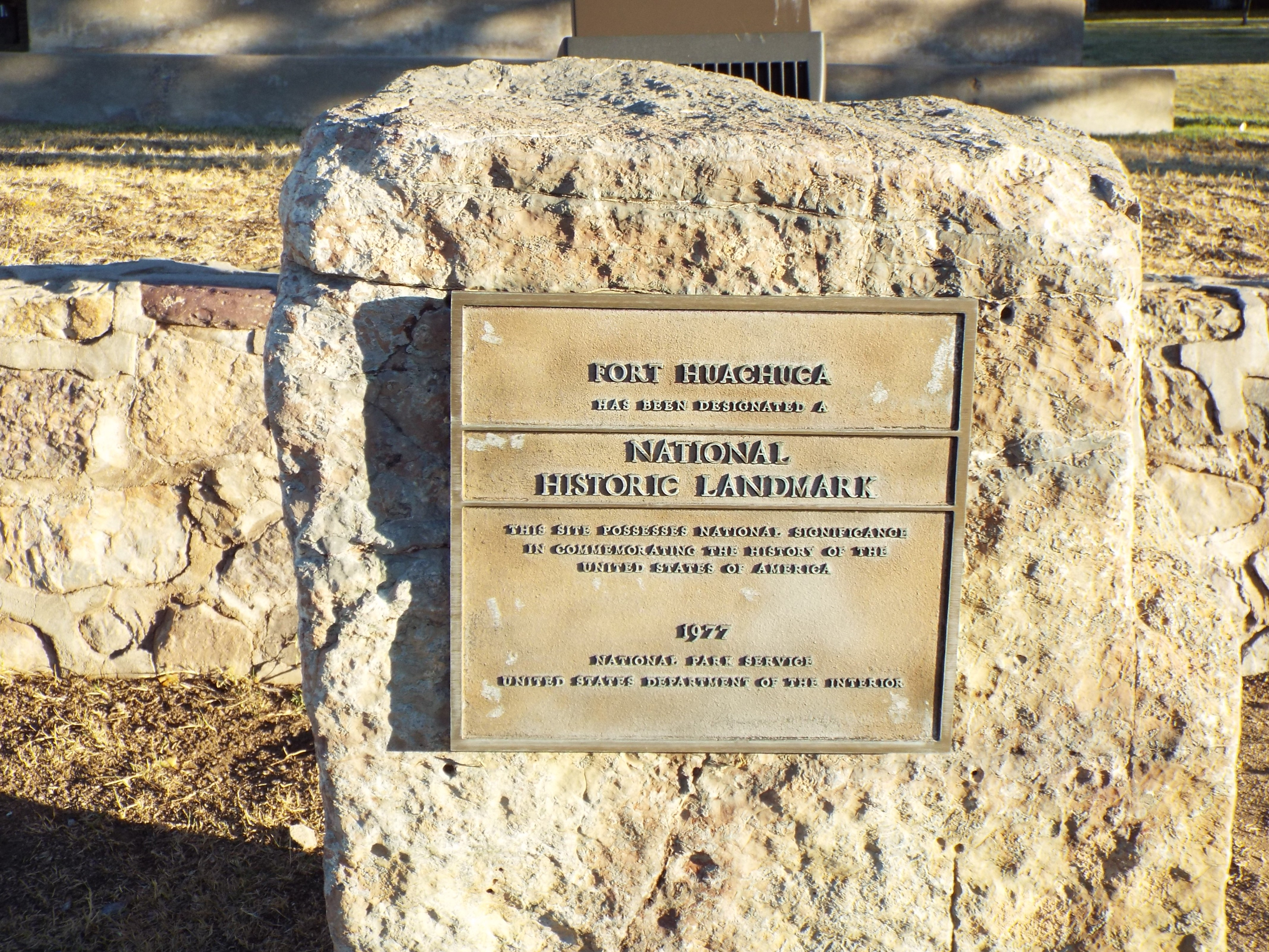
National Historic Landmark

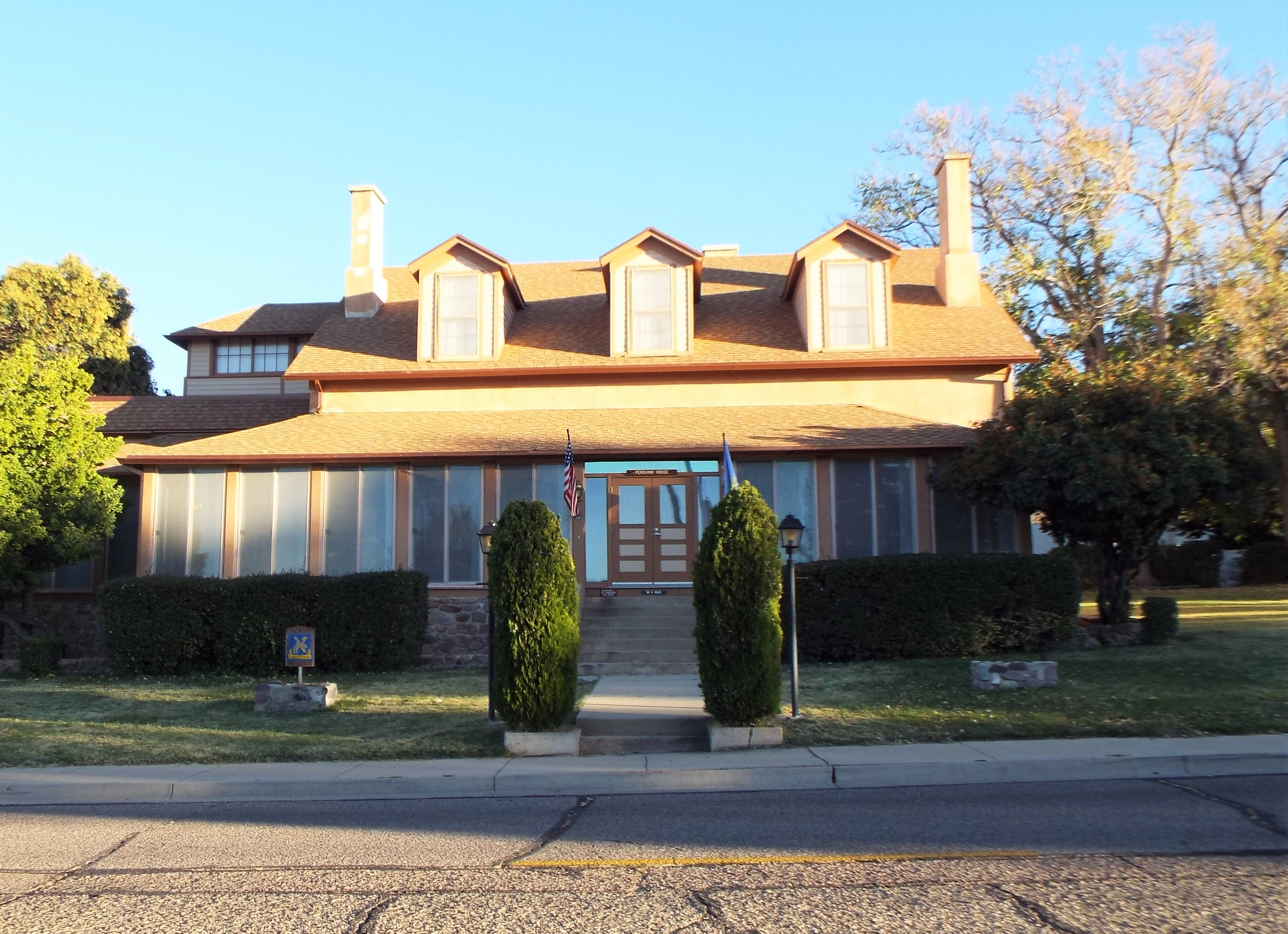
Pershing House.

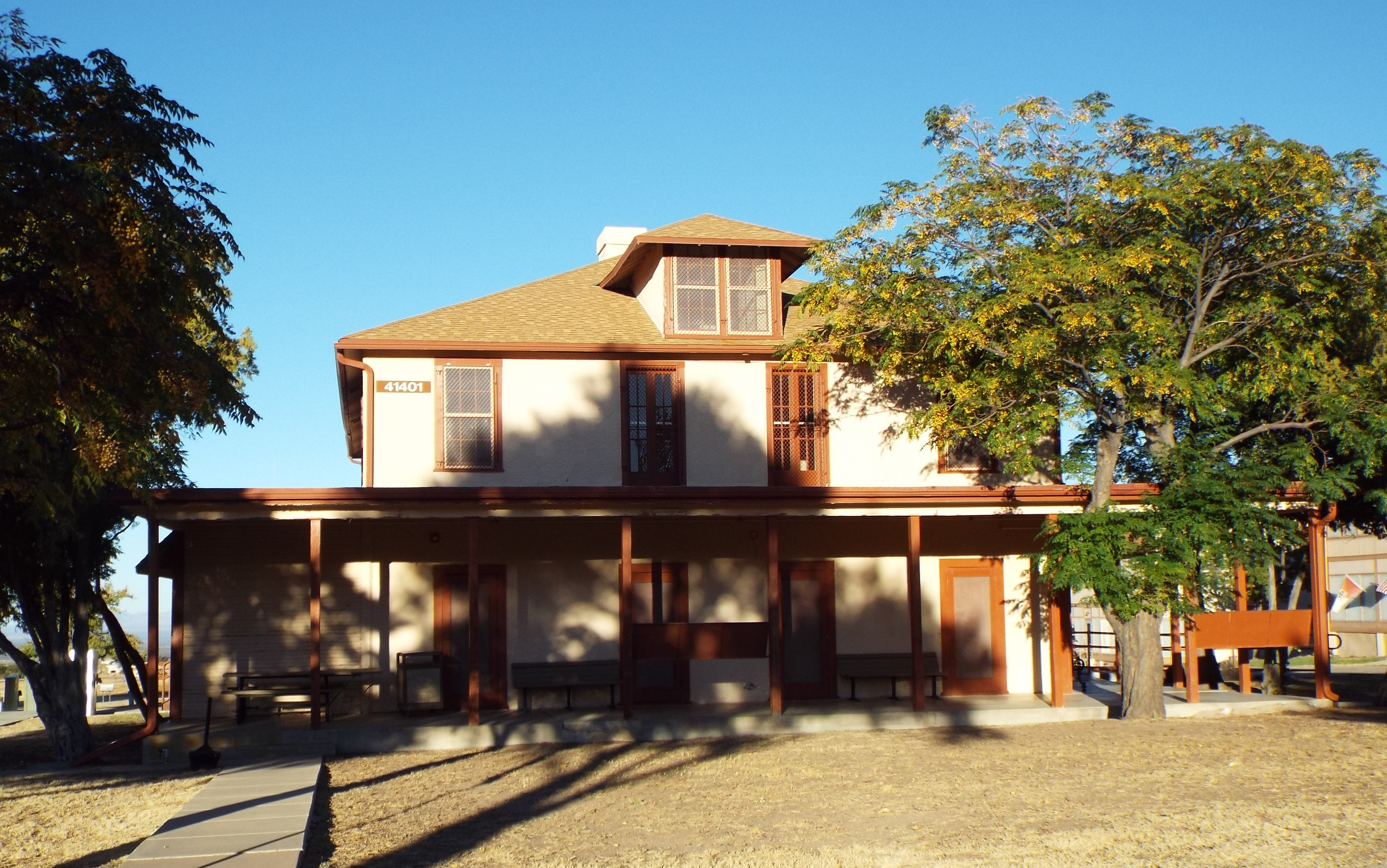
Original Fort Headquarters.

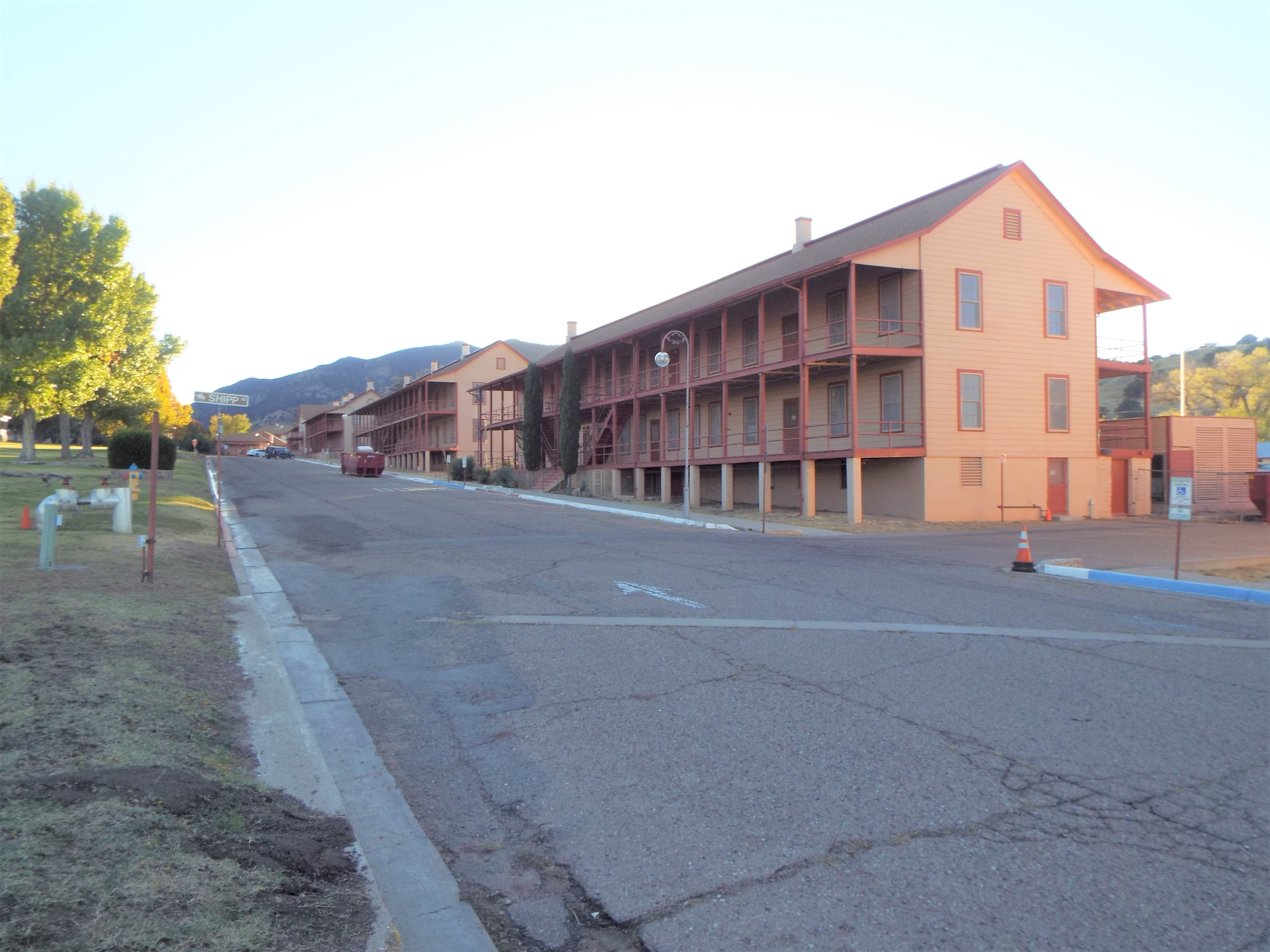
Old Post Barracks.

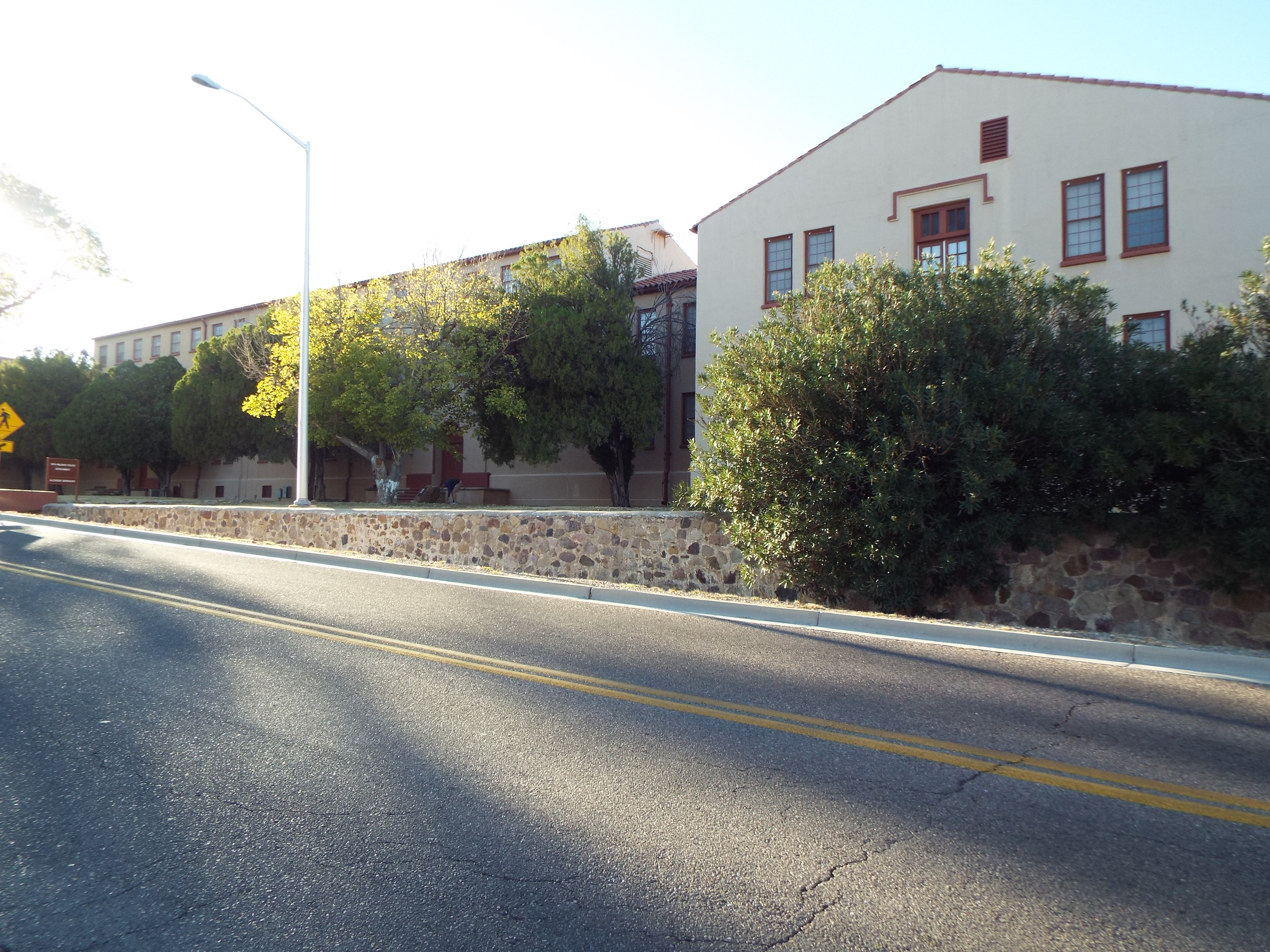
Leonard Wood Hall.

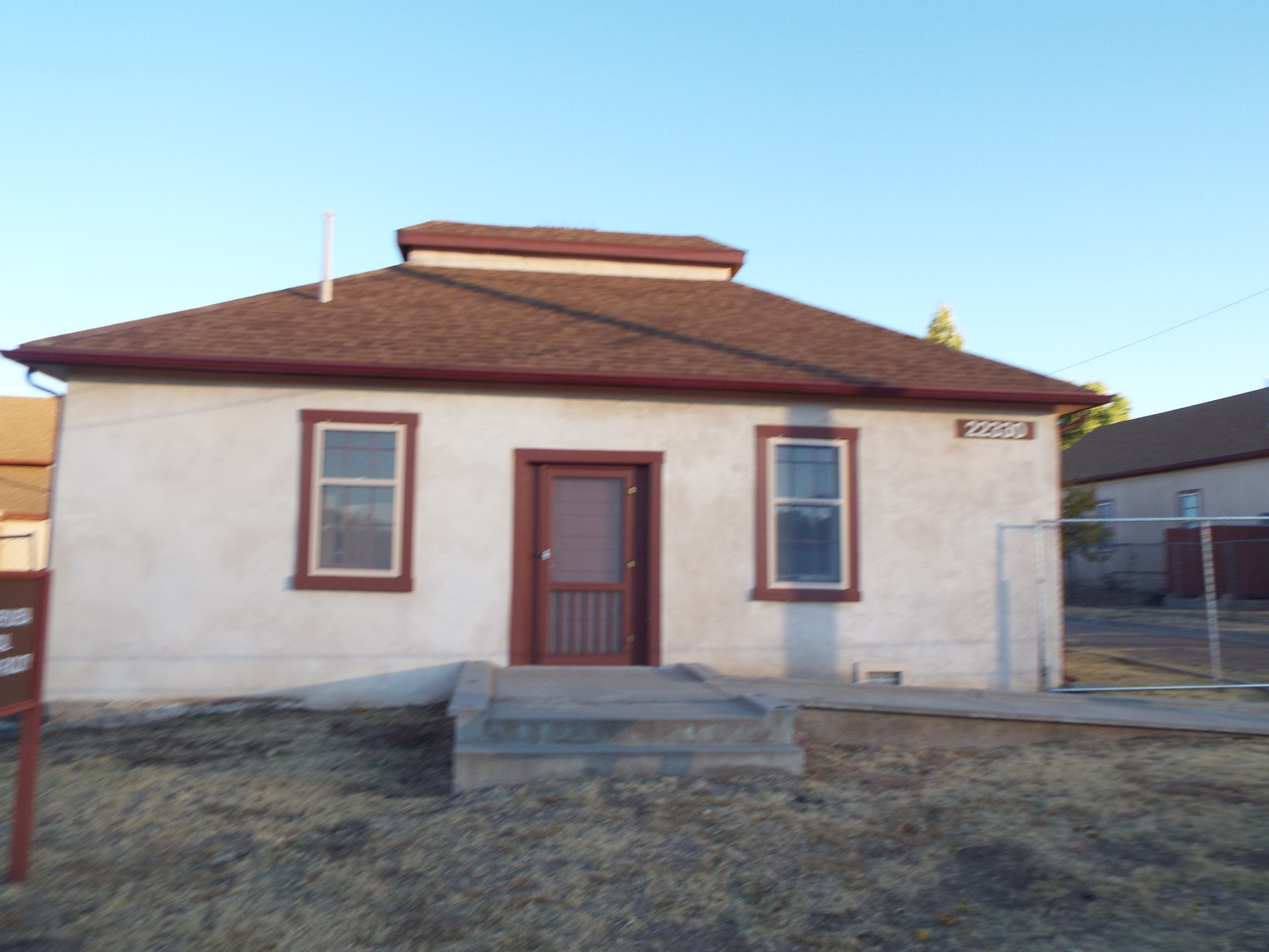
Ordnance Warehouse.

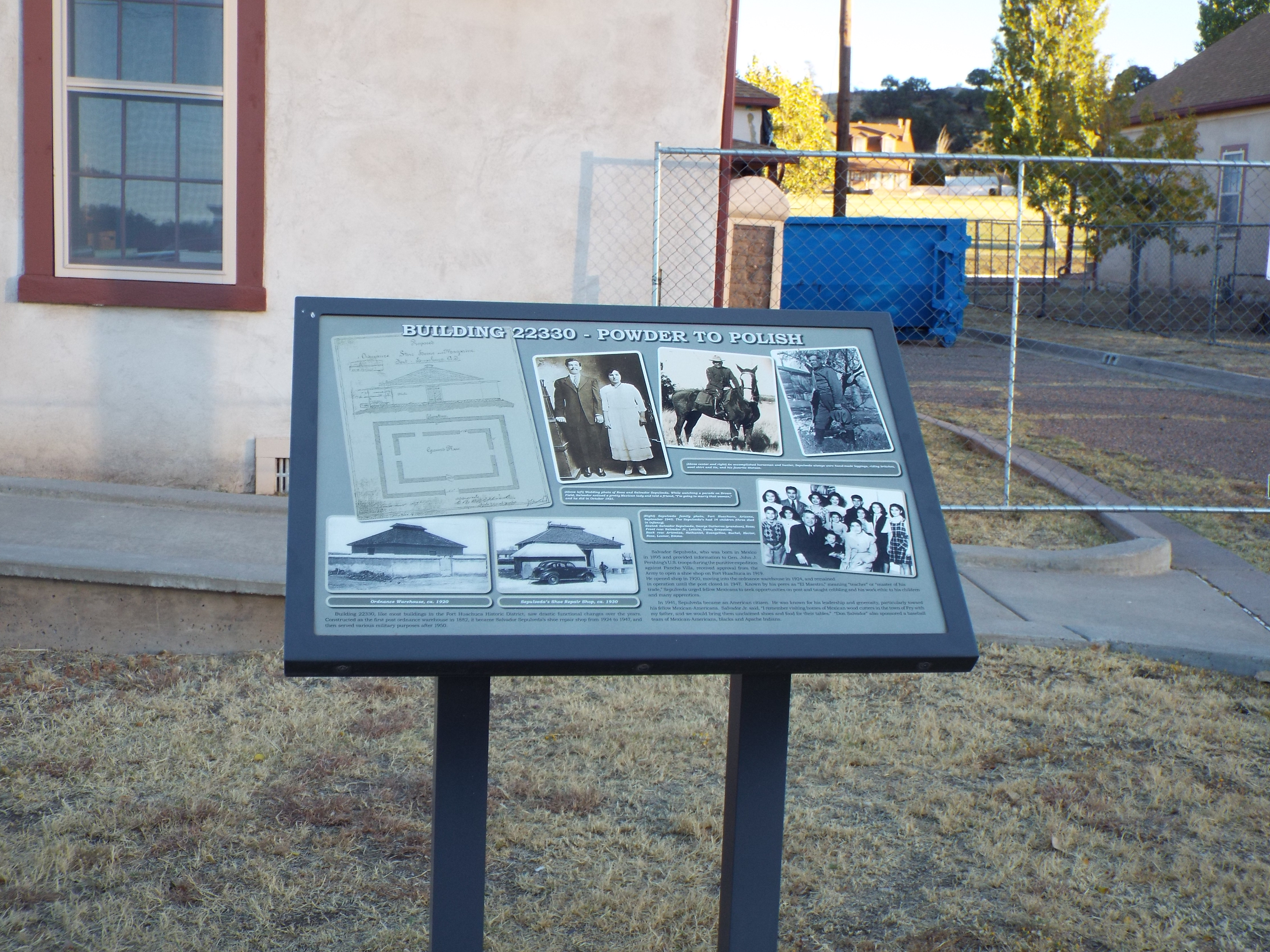
Ordnance Warehouse marker.

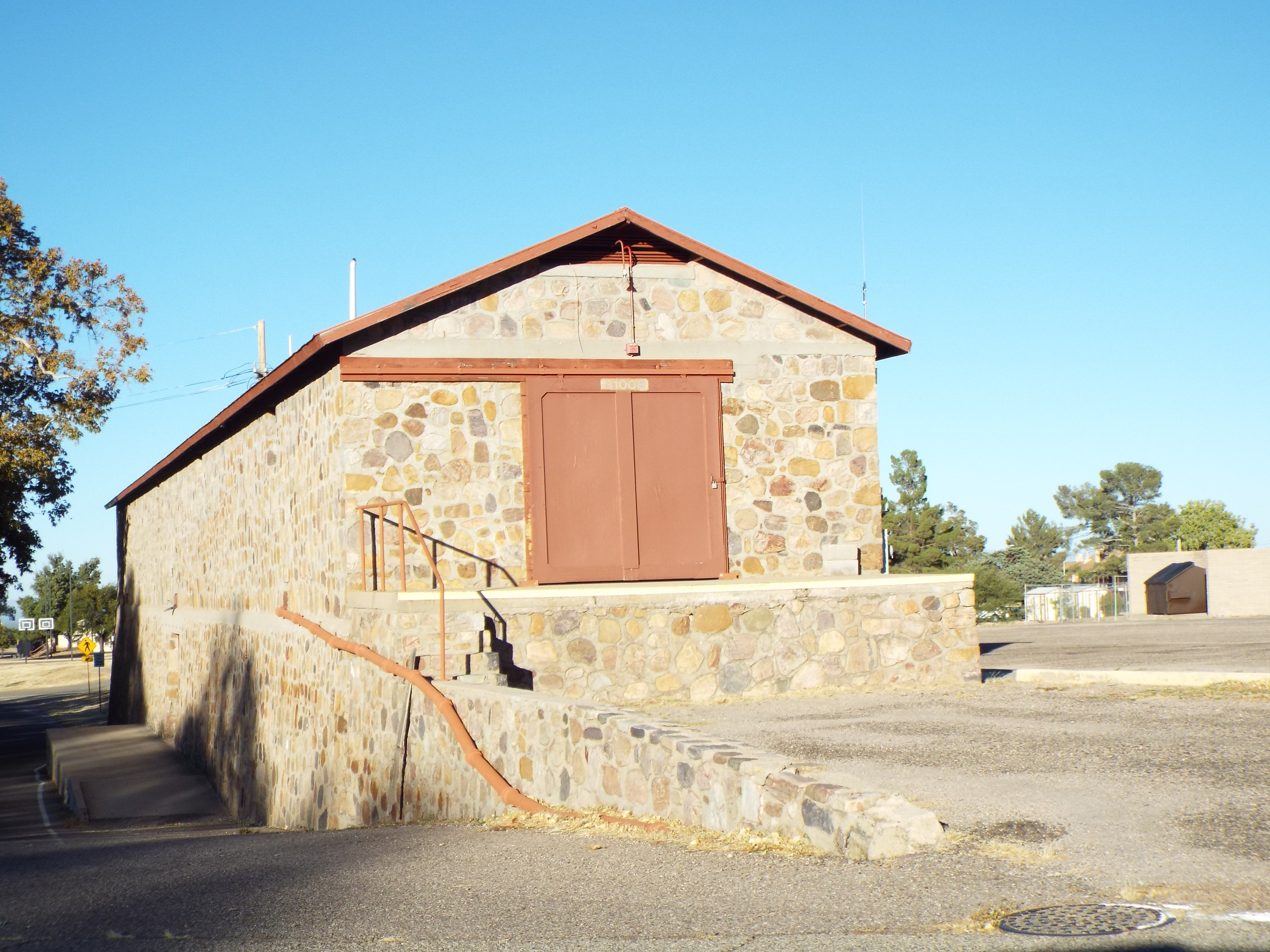
Hangman's Warehouse.

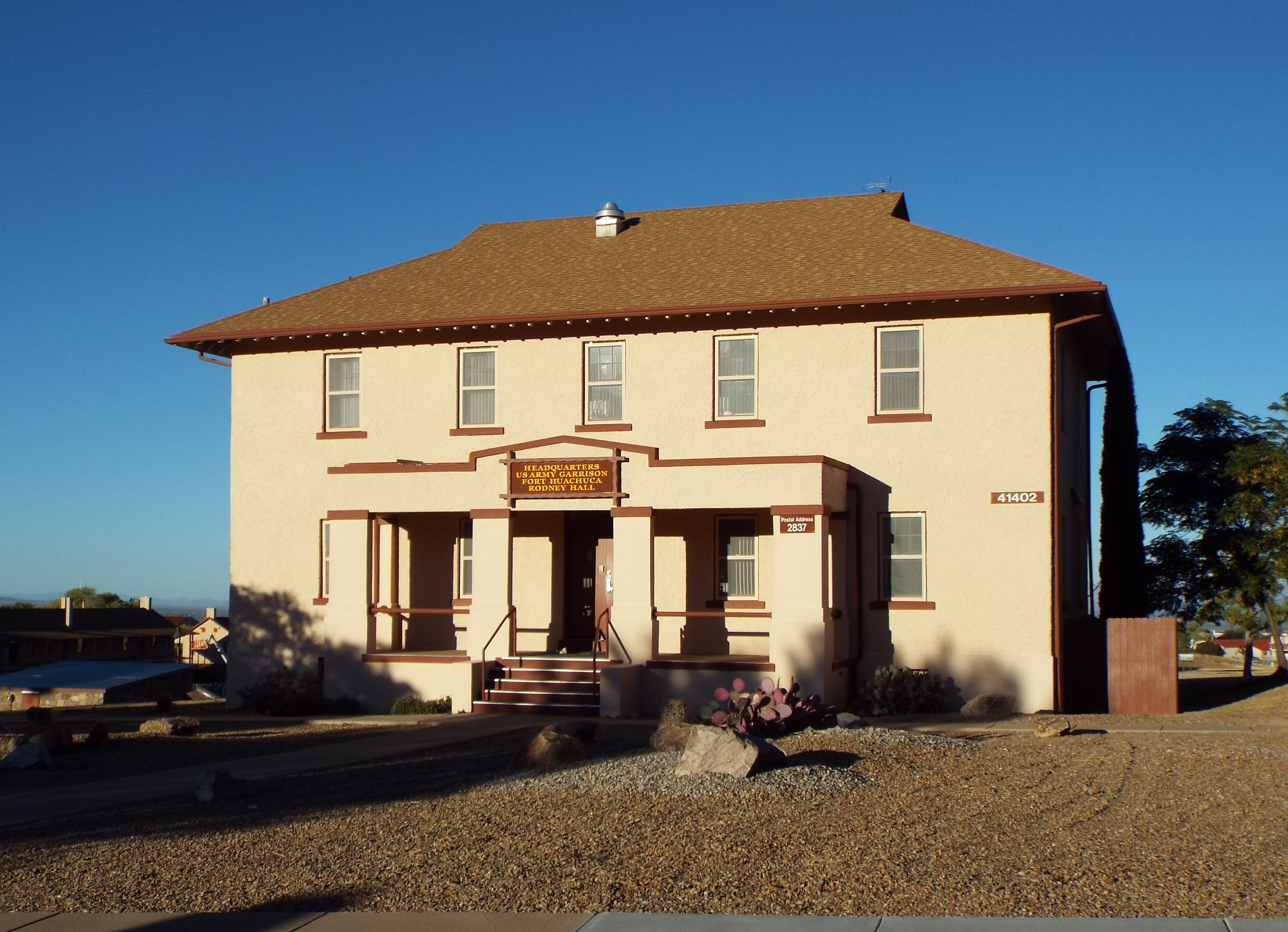
Rodney Hall .

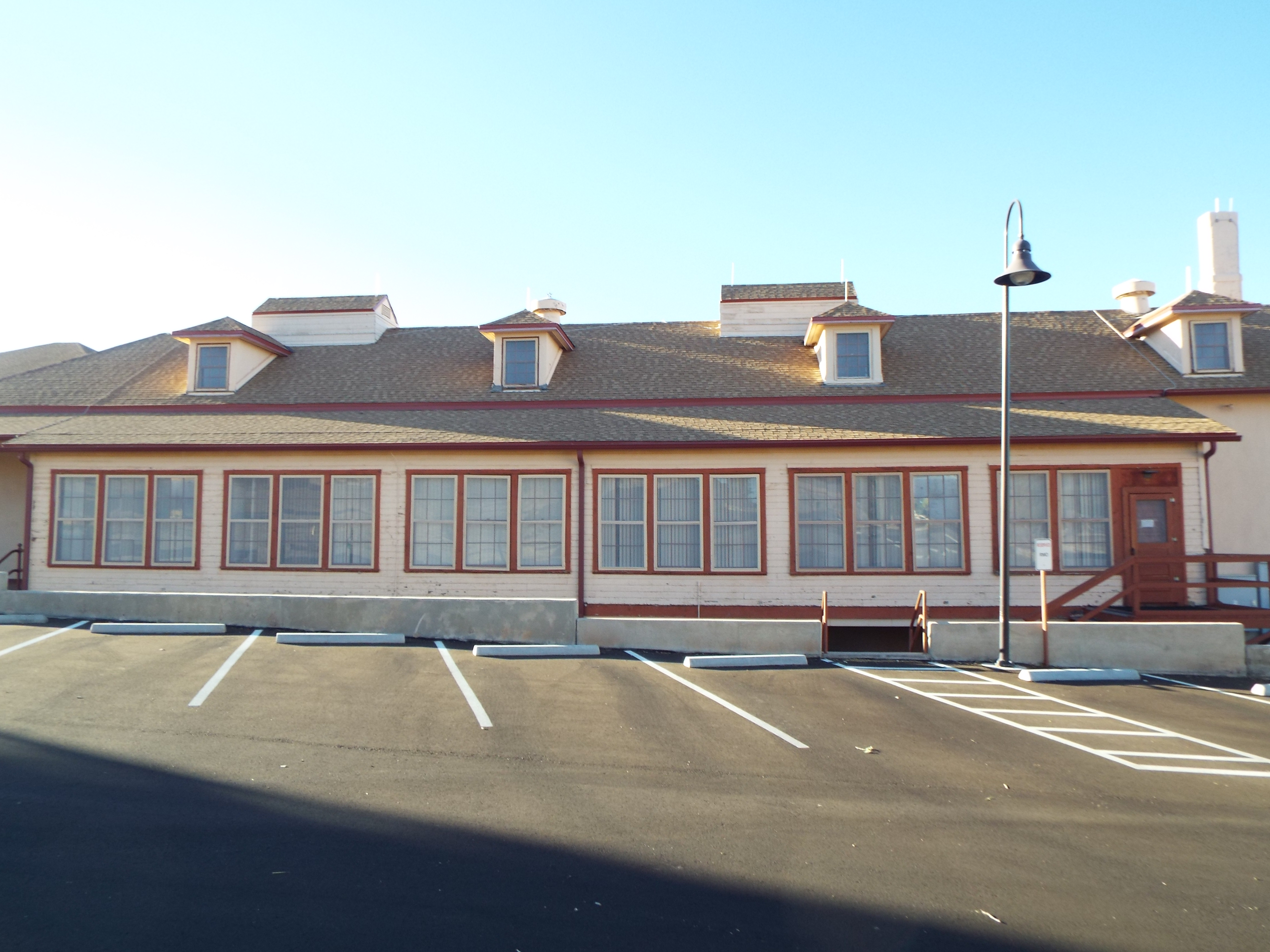
Sam Kee Hall.

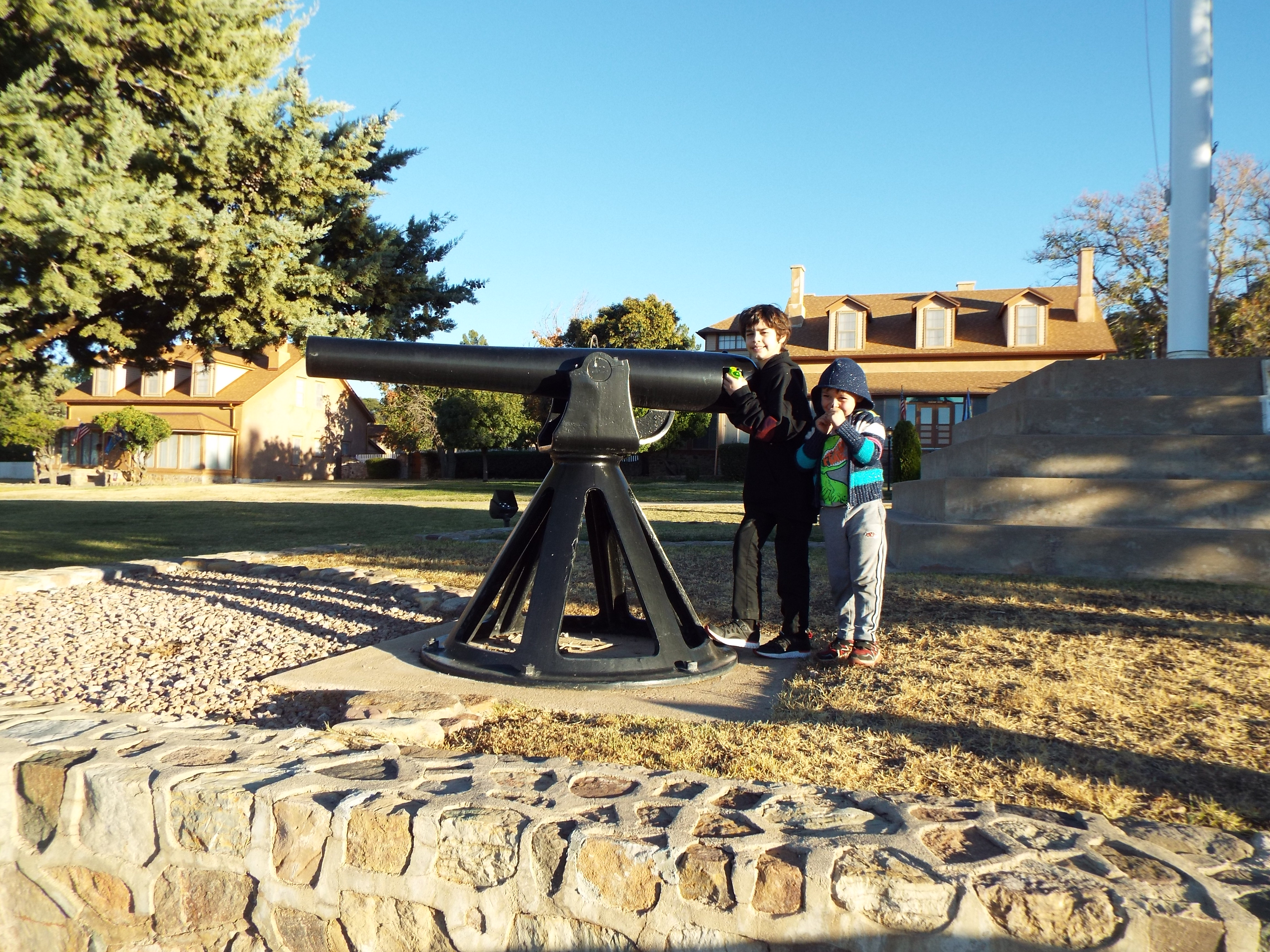
Children posing with a Parrott Rifle (Parrott Gun).
Fort Huachuca National Historic District

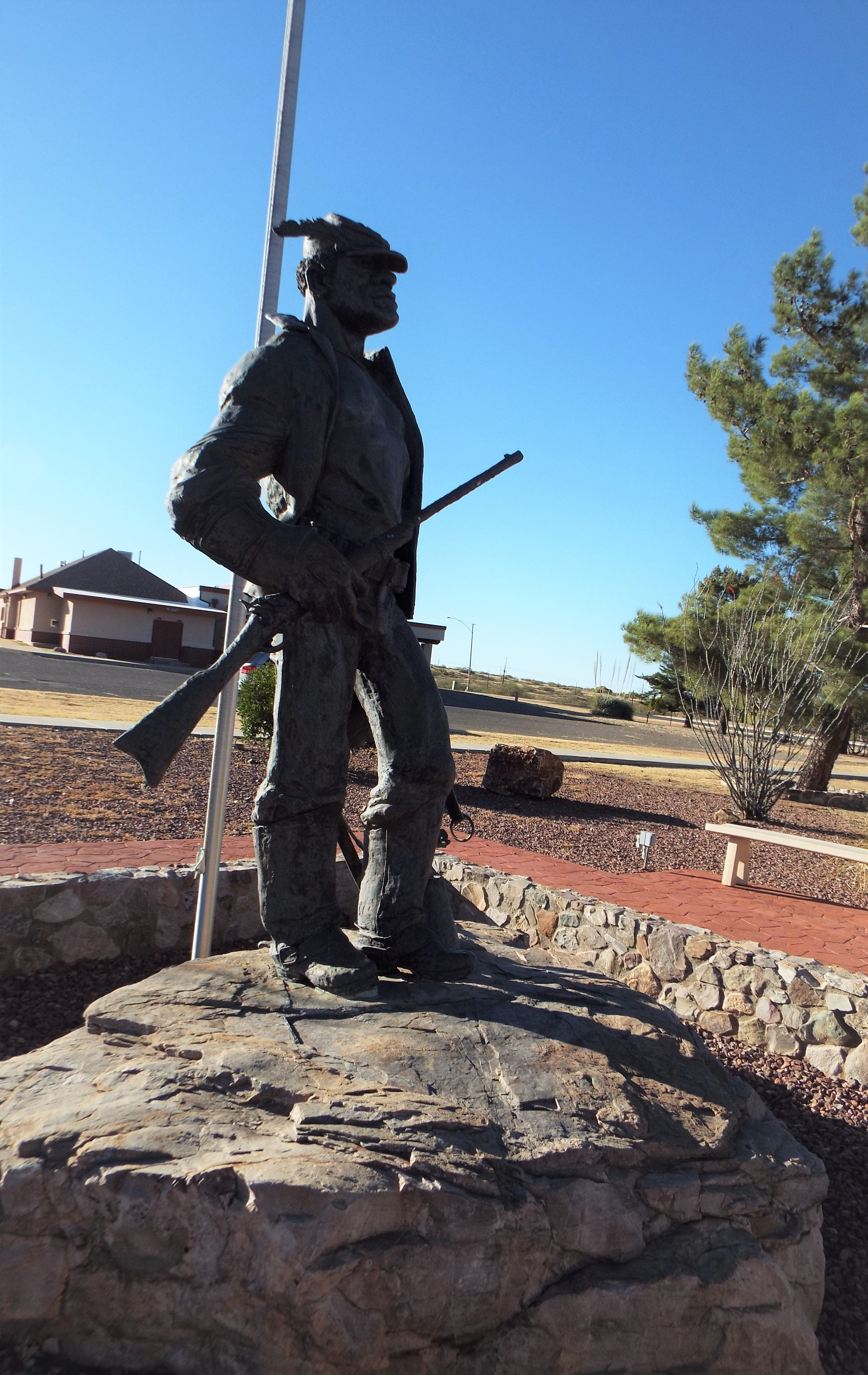
Buffalo Soldier Legacy Plaza

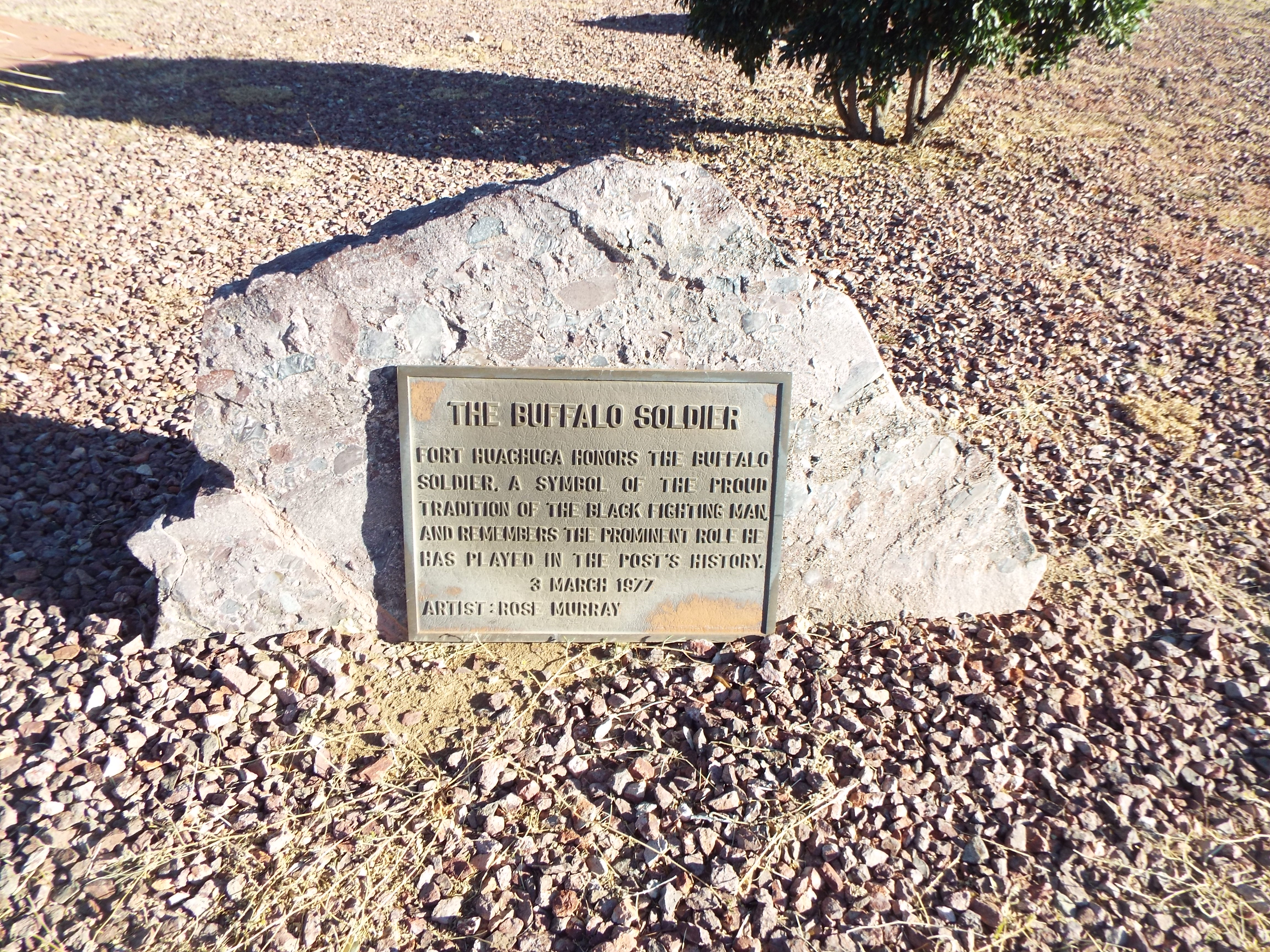
Buffalo Soldier Legacy Plaza Marker.

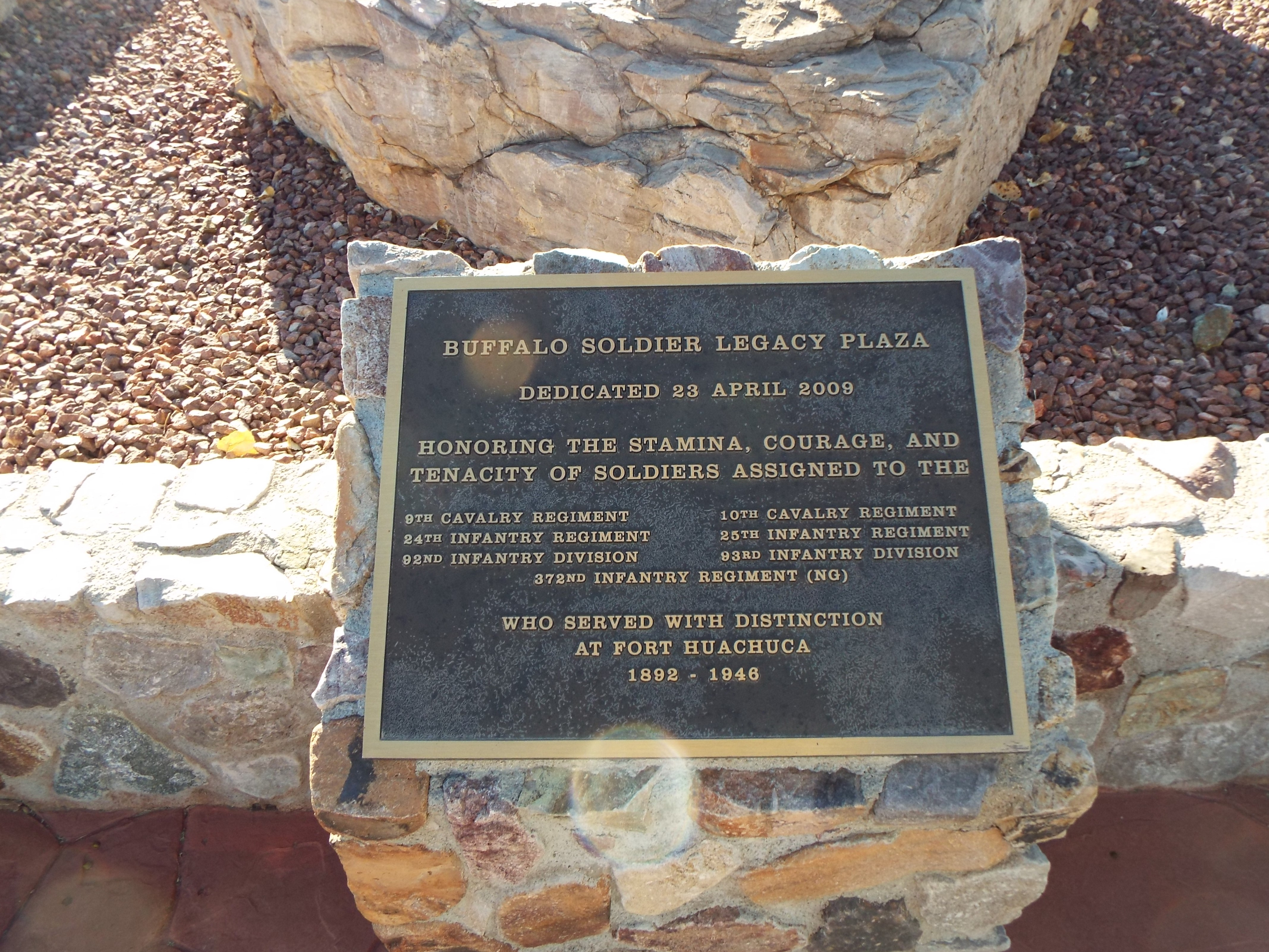
Buffalo Soldier Legacy Plaza Marker.
Fort Huachuca National Historic District

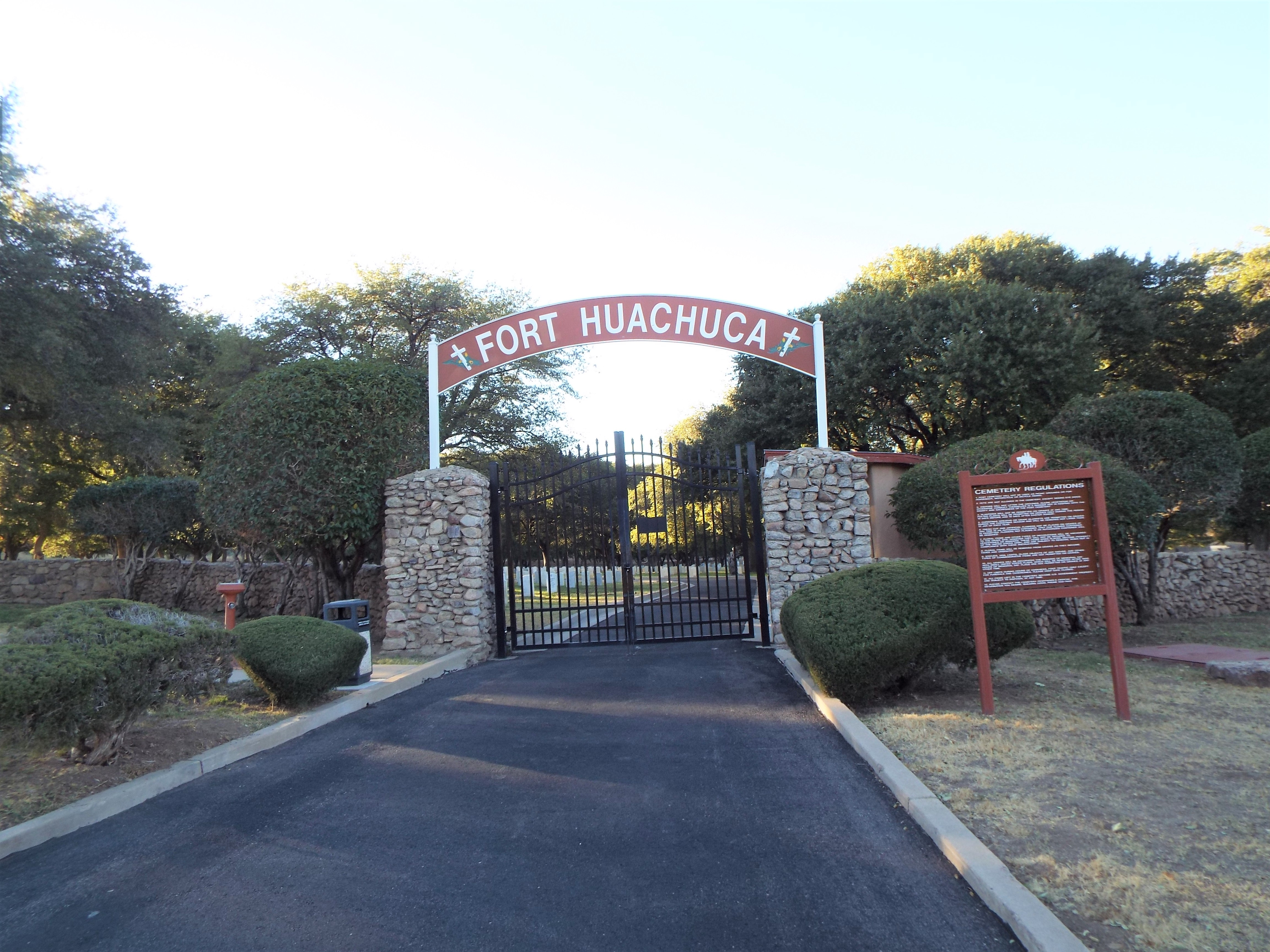
Old Post Cemetery

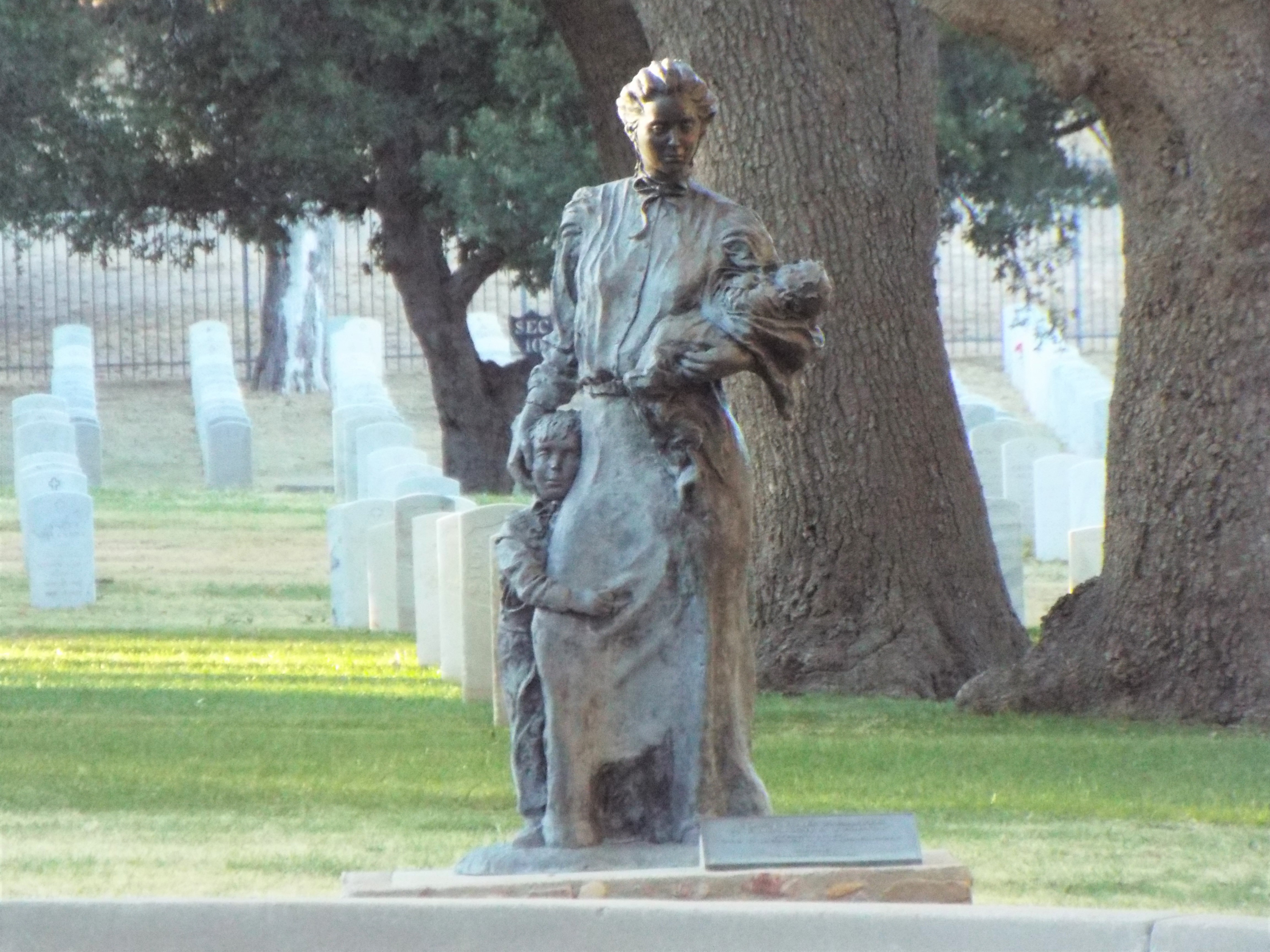
Mourning Hearts Statue.

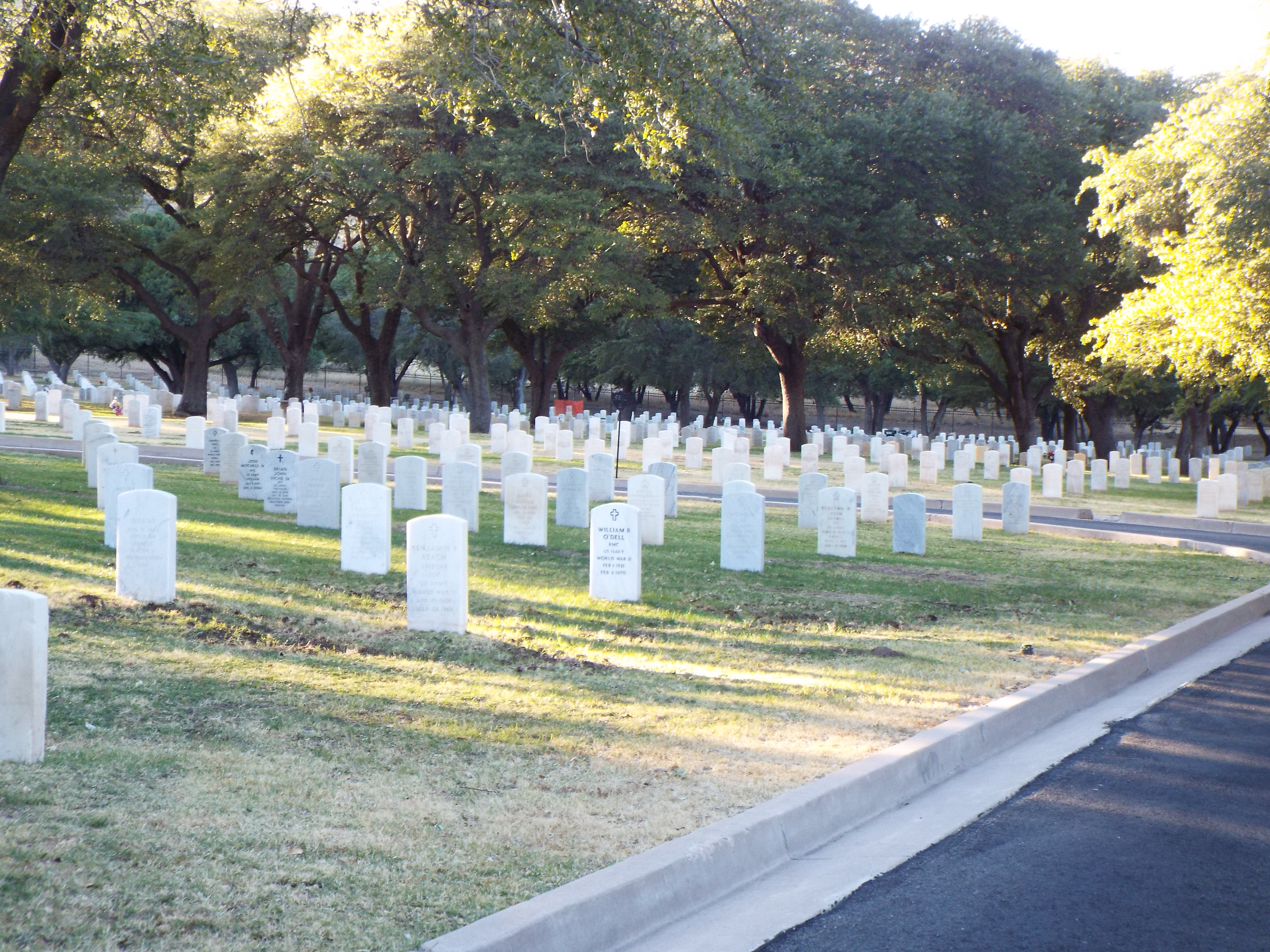
Graves.

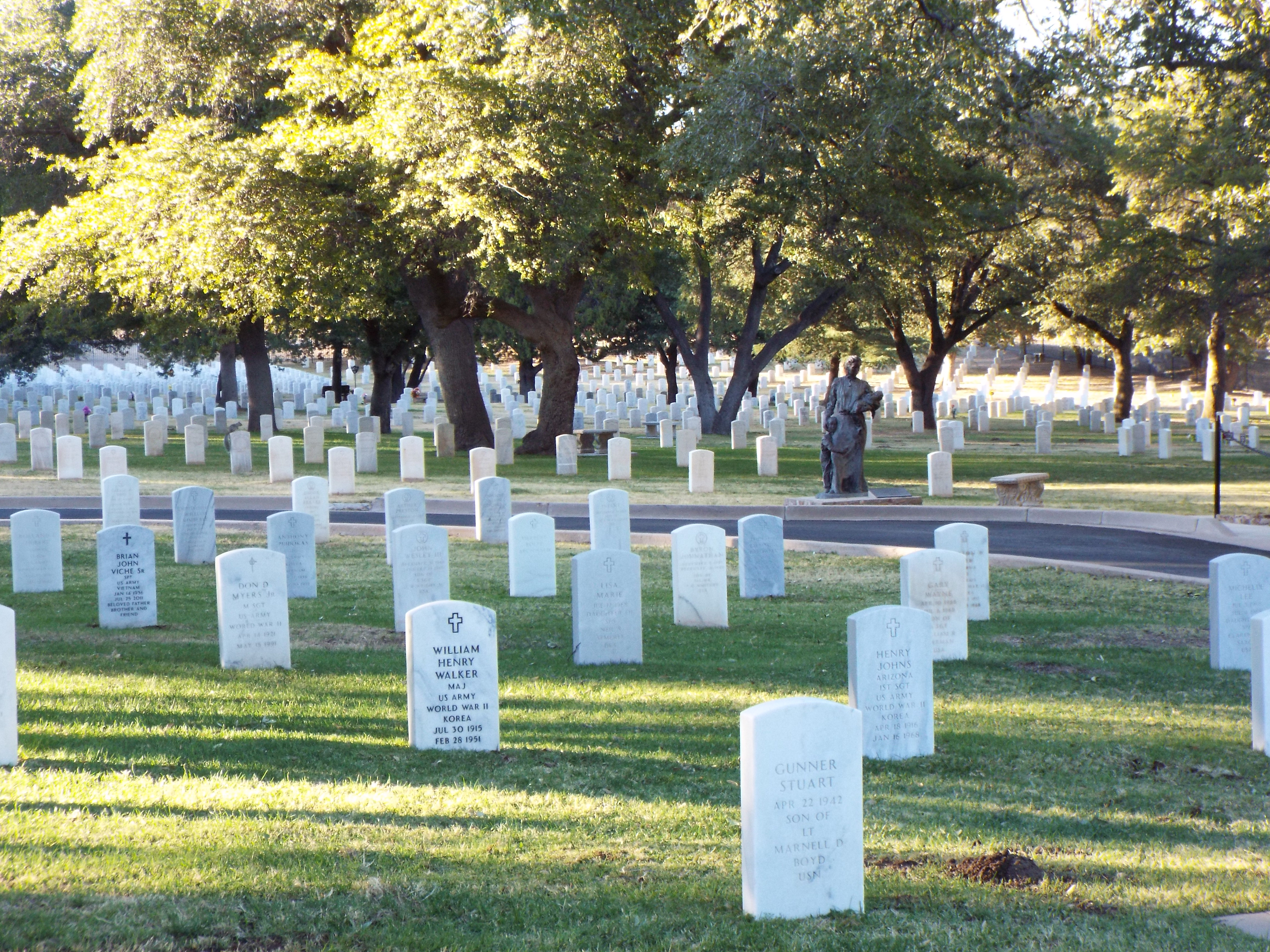
Graves.

== Properties not pictured ==
The historic properties which are not pictured are the following:

- The Bernard House (#22116) – Completed in 1884,
- The Hazen House (#22104) – Was constructed in 1891
- The Carr House (#22114)
- The Miles House (#22128) – The building today bears the name of General Nelson A. Miles.
- The Wilder House (#22132) – Is named for Colonel Wilbur E. Wilder who commanded the 5th Cavalry at Fort Huachuca in 1913.
- The Winans House (#22138) – Honors Colonel Edwin B. Winans who commanded the Post and the l0th Cavalry from 1920 to 1923.
- The Macomb House (#22140) – Honors Captain Augustus C. Macomb who commanded the 5th Cavalry and Fort Huachuca.
- The Sanford House (#22144) – Is named for Major George Bliss Sanford, 1st US Cavalry, who was a Huachuca commander in 1881. He began his career in Arizona as a Lieutenant of the Dragoons in 1862, returning to the Arizona Territory after several Civil War actions.
- The Brayton Hall (#21115) – Had its beginnings in 1887 as an amusement hall
- The DeRussy Hall (#22326) – Was named for another Post Commander (1891–92), Colonel Isaac D. DeRussy, 11th US Infantry. This $800 adobe structure was first opened 1D 1899 as a Post Office and school.
- The Gresham Hall (#22332) – Was completed in 1883 as the Quartermaster's Storehouse
- The Mar Kim Hall (#22334) – Was named for a nephew of Sam Kee.

== See also ==
- Sierra Vista, Arizona
- Fort Tyson
- Fort Huachuca
- Fort Lowell
- Fort Whipple
