= Port (surname) =

Port is a surname. Notable people with the surname include:

- Annabel Port (born 1975), English radio personality
- Bernard Port (1925–2007), English footballer
- Chal Port (1931–2011), American college baseball coach
- Chris Port (born 1967), American football player
- Jaan Port (1891–1950), Estonian biologist
- Mart Port (1922–2012), Estonian architect
- Mike Port (born 1945), American baseball executive
- Sidney Port (1911–2007), American lawyer, business executive, and philanthropist
- Stephen Port (born 1975), English serial killer
- Whitney Port (born 1985), American television personality

== See also ==
- James F. Ports, Jr. (born 1958), American politician
