= Postal inspector =

Postal inspector may refer to:

- The United States Postal Inspection Service (or USPIS), the law enforcement arm of the United States Postal Service
- Postal Inspector, a 1936 American film directed by Otto Brower

== See also ==
- The Inspectors (TV series), postal inspector television show
