= Postal service (disambiguation) =

Postal service may refer to:

- Mail, or post, a system for physically transporting postcards, letters, and parcels
- List of postal entities, including countries' postal services
- List of national postal services
- List of postal services abroad in the late 19th and early 20th century
- The Postal Service, an American music group

== See also ==
- Post Office (disambiguation)
- Postal (disambiguation)
- Post (disambiguation)
- Mail (disambiguation)
