= Gone Postal =

Icelandic death metal band

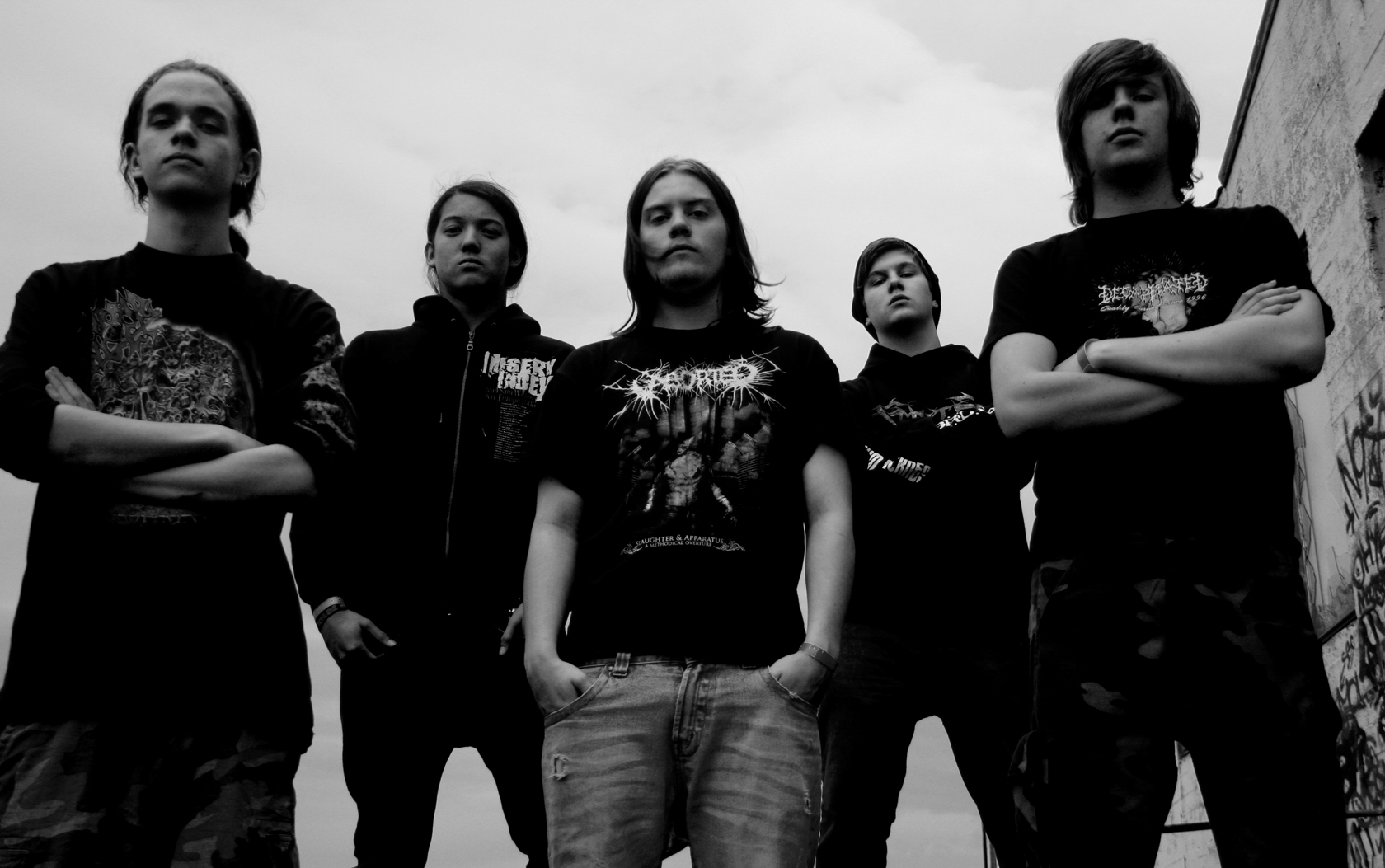
- From left to right: Haukur Hannes, Þorbjörn Steingrímsson, Nökkvi G. Gylfason, Daníel S. Hallgrímsson, Stefán A. Stefánsson.

Background information
- Origin: Kópavogur, Iceland
- Genres: Death metal; black metal
- Years active: 2007–2014
- Label: Unsigned
- Members: Þorbjörn Steingrímsson; Nökkvi G. Gylfason; Stefán A. Stefánsson; Ævar Örn Sigurðsson
- Past members: Haukur Hannes; Daníel S. Hallgrímsson; Karl B. Flosason; Tristan Barnes
- Website: Myspace

Gone Postal is a four-piece Icelandic death metal band from Kópavogur, Iceland, that Haukur Hannes and Nökkvi G. Gylfason founded in 2007.

== History ==
Haukur Hannes (guitar) and Nökkvi G. Gylfason (guitar, vocals) formed Gone Postal in 2007, along with Þorbjörn Steingrímsson (vocals) and Jón P. Gunnarsson (drums). It started playing hardcore in early 2007. The band dismissed Gunnarsson, recruited Stefán A. Stefánsson (drums) and Karl B. Flosason (bass), and focused more on death metal. Gone Postal recorded a self-produced web-based album during the summer of 2007, In the Depths of Despair, which never came out as an actual album. The album contained six tracks that would be re-recorded and published on the 2008 album of the same title.

The group dismissed Flosason in late 2007 and recruited Úlfur Hansson, who stayed on as session bassist until early 2008. By that time, Gone Postal had developed a following in the Icelandic death metal scene. The band recruited Daníel S. Hallgrímsson shortly after Hansson left, and he stayed with the band until late 2008.

In January 2008, Gone Postal started recording their full-length debut, In the Depths of Despair, which they finished in the autumn of the same year. They officially released the ten-song album on December 2, 2008.

In 2009, Nökkvi stated in an interview that:

"...the reason for releasing a full length album is that it's so unheard of within the Icelandic metal scene. Bands usually just release four or five song demos or ep's and we just didn't want to do that since we had enough material for a full-length album".

In January 2009, Gone Postal announced that they would take a short break from performing to complete writing, practicing and recording their second album, tentatively titled Spearheading the Umbrageous.

In February 2009, founding member Haukur Hannes left Gone Postal due to musical and personal differences.

The band ended in 2014. The remaining members (Ævar Örn Sigurðsson, Þorbjörn Steingrímsson, Nökkvi G. Gylfason and Stefán Ari Stefánsson) reformed in 2015 and shifted their focus towards black metal under the name Zhrine. They released the album Unortheta under that name on April 8, 2016 to critical acclaim. Stefánsson left Zhrine after the release of Unortheta and Tumi Snær Gíslason replaced him.

== Members ==
- Þorbjörn Steingrímsson (2007–2014) - vocals, guitar
- Nökkvi G. Gylfason (2007–2014) - guitar, vocals
- Ævar Örn Sigurðsson (2008–2014) - bass
- Stefán A. Stefánsson (2007–2014) - drums

=== Former members ===
- Tristan Barnes (2010) - guitar
- Haukur Hannes (2007–2009) - guitar
- Daníel S. Hallgrímsson (2008) - bass
- Karl B. Flosason (2007) - bass
- Úlfur Hansson (session live) (2007) - bass

== Discography ==
=== Studio albums ===
Year	Title	Label
2008	In the Depths of Despair	Molestin
2012	Spearheading the Umbrageous	Molestin

=== Other ===
Year	Title	Description
2008	Grindethic Records: Damn & Blast Vol.4	Compilation
2008	Promo 2008	Self-released demo
2011	Promo II	Self-released promo with rough mixes from the upcoming album
