= Port of Call =

Port(s) of Call may refer to:

- Port of call (nautical term), an intermediate stop for a ship on its sailing itinerary

== Film ==
- Ports of Call (film), a 1925 American silent film
- Port of Call (1948 film), a Swedish film by Ingmar Bergman
- Port of Call (2015 film), a Hong Kong film by Philip Yung

== Literature ==
- Ports of Call (Maalouf novel), a 1991 novel by Amin Maalouf
- Ports of Call (Vance novel), a 1998 novel by Jack Vance

== Music ==
- Ports of Call, or Escales, a 1924 orchestral suite by Jacques Ibert
- "Port of Call", a 1996 song by Porter Ricks from Biokinetics
- Port of Call, a 2000 album by Silje Nergaard

== Other uses ==
- Ports of Call (video game), a 1987 business simulation game
- Ports of Call Travel Club, a defunct United States air travel club, popularly known as "Denver Ports of Call", not a name the club used.
