= Postal abbreviation =

Postal abbreviation may refer to:

- Australian postal abbreviations
- Canadian subnational postal abbreviations
- United States postal abbreviations
