= Port (company) =

Israeli-founded software developer platform company

- Type: Private
- Industry: Enterprise software
- Founded: 2022
- Founders: Zohar Einy, Yonatan Boguslavski
- Products: Internal developer portal, software catalog, workflow automation
- Website: www.port.io

Port is a software company founded in 2022 by Zohar Einy and Yonatan Boguslavski. It develops a platform for building internal developer portals, which enable software engineering organizations to centralize information about software services, development tools, infrastructure and workflows. The platform provides software catalogs, self-service operations and workflow automation intended to help developers manage software delivery and infrastructure more independently.

== History ==
Port was founded in 2022 by Zohar Einy and Yonatan Boguslavski, who had previously worked together in the Israel Defense Forces. The founders developed the company around the idea of providing software developers with a centralized interface for accessing engineering tools, infrastructure resources and operational workflows.

In November 2022, Port announced a US$7 million seed funding round led by TLV Partners, with participation from technology entrepreneurs and investors including Yoav Landman and Shlomo Kramer.

In September 2023, the company announced an $18 million Series A funding round led by Team8, bringing its reported total funding to $23 million. The company also introduced Port Ocean, an open-source extensibility framework intended to support the development of integrations, self-service actions and automations.

In October 2024, Port raised $35 million in a Series B funding round led by Accel, with participation from Bessemer Venture Partners and existing investors. The company reported that its customers included GitHub, LG and BT Group. The funding announcement also highlighted the integration of large language models into the platform for tasks such as searching engineering information and assisting with software development workflows.

In December 2025, Port announced a $100 million Series C funding round led by General Atlantic, with participation from existing investors including Accel, Bessemer Venture Partners and Team8. TechCrunch reported that the investment valued the company at approximately $800 million. The company was also expanding its platform to address the management and governance of AI agents in software development.

== Platform ==
Port's platform is an internal developer portal designed to provide a unified interface for software engineering organizations. Internal developer portals consolidate information and capabilities that would otherwise be distributed across development tools, infrastructure systems and documentation.

The platform includes a software catalog that represents an organization's software components and infrastructure resources. Organizations can customize the catalog to reflect their architecture, ownership structures and engineering processes, and integrate information from external development and operations tools.

Port also provides self-service actions that allow developers to initiate operational tasks through a centralized interface. These actions can include creating software services, provisioning resources and executing automated development or operations workflows. The platform is intended to reduce reliance on manual requests to platform engineering and DevOps teams.

Other capabilities include workflow automation, engineering scorecards and integrations with software development tools. Scorecards can be used to assess software components against organizational standards, while automated workflows can help teams apply consistent development and operational practices.

The company has also incorporated artificial intelligence capabilities into its platform. Reported applications include natural-language searches across engineering information, assistance with interpreting failed builds and recommendations based on an organization's internal software components. Following its 2025 funding round, Port expanded its focus to include AI agents and their role in software development workflows.

Port competes in the internal developer portal market, which also includes Spotify's Backstage project and commercial developer platform providers. Unlike a self-managed open-source framework, Port offers a managed platform that organizations can customize and integrate with their existing engineering environments.
