= Coin manipulation =

Sleight of hand

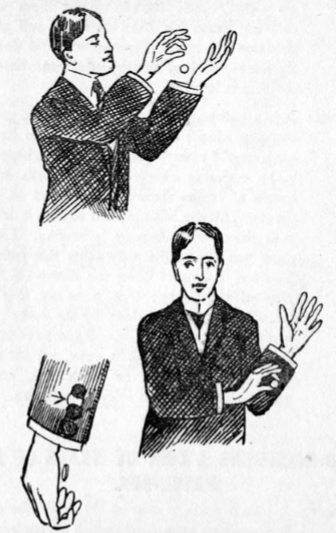
Will Goldston's trick of passing a coin through his sleeve

Coin manipulation is the art of manipulating coins in skillful flourishes, usually on or around the hands. The difficulty of the tricks range greatly, from some that take a few minutes to accomplish, to much more complex ones that can take months, even years, to master. One of the best-known flourishes is the relatively advanced coin walk.

Coin magic is the manipulating of coins to entertain audiences. Because coins are small, most coin tricks are considered close-up magic or table magic, as the audience must be close to the performer to see the effects. Though stage conjurers generally do not use coin effects, coin magic is sometimes performed onstage using large coins. In a different type of performance setting, a close-up coin magician (or 'coin worker') will use a large video projector so the audience can see the magic on a big screen. Coin magic is generally considered harder to master than other close-up techniques such as card magic, as it requires great skill and grace to perform convincingly, and this requires much practice to acquire.

== Elements ==
Coin effects include productions, vanishes, transformations, transpositions, teleportations, penetrations, restorations, levitations and mental magic—some are combined in a single routine. A simple effect might involve borrowing a coin, making it vanish, concealing the coin, then reproducing it again unexpectedly and returning it to the owner. More complex effects may involve multiple coins, substituting or switching coins and other objects or props can be employed (e.g. handkerchiefs, glasses) as well as the coins. However, the power of most coin magic lies in its simplicity and the solidity of the object The basic skills of sleight of hand and misdirection often appear most magical without complex equipment. Almost any audience will be amazed by the simplest mystery, such as passing a coin through a table.

== Sleights and tricks ==
Some classic coin magic effects:

- Coin vanish – making a coin seemingly vanish.
- Coin production – making a coin seemingly appear.
- Transposition – making two coins switch places

Some classic coin magic plots:

- Chink-a-chink – A bare-handed Matrix.
- Coins Across – The magical transfer of multiple coins from one hand to another. This effect is generally performed one coin at a time.
- Coin Bite – Taking a bite out of a coin then visually restoring it right in front of the spectator.
- Coins Through Table – Coins penetrate through the surface of the table.
- Coin to Bottle – A coin is slammed into a sealed bottle.
- Coins to Glass – Similar to coins across – coins transfer from one hand to a glass.
- Matrix – A teleportation illusion of four coins moving invisibly under the cover of four playing cards.
- Miser's Dream – Grabbing multiple coins from thin air. Popularized by Thomas Nelson Downs, who would drop coin after coin into a borrowed top hat.
- Spellbound – Visually changing one coin into another at the tip of the fingers, while only showing one coin at all times.
- Tenkai Pennies – A two coin routine where one coin travels from one hand to the other.
- Three fly – A coins across type effect involving three coins, visually transferring from one hand to another at the eye or chest level.

A sampling of coin sleights and moves:

- Palming – A form of concealment.
- Sleeving – A form of vanishing a coin.
- Lapping – A form of ditching a coin.
- The French Drop – a retention of vision coin vanish involving the Passing of a coin from one hand to the other than making it disappear.
- The Muscle Pass – Shooting a coin from one hand to the other This can be done in such a way that can make the coin look as if it is defying gravity

=== Coin walk ===
The coin walk is a type of coin flourish in which a coin is flipped over the fingers to create the illusion of a coin walking across the back of the hand. It is one of the most famous coin manipulation feats. It is also known as the coin roll, knuckle roll, and the steeplechase flourish, and can also be performed with poker chips, slugs, or other similar implements.

The manipulation is generally performed on the first phalanx bone of each finger of one hand. After the coin has been flipped over by each phalanx, not including the smallest finger, the thumb brings the coin back under the hand and back to the index finger to repeat the sequence as many times as desired.

==== In popular culture ====
Van Heflin's character Sam performs this manipulation throughout the 1946 film The Strange Love of Martha Ivers. Woody Allen's character Miles Monroe also performs this to seduce Diane Keaton's character Luna in the 1973 film Sleeper. The characters Peter, Walter, and Elizabeth Bishop perform this trick in the TV show Fringe. Steve Carell and Alan Arkin also perform this feat in tandem (almost a "dueling knuckle walk") in the movie The Incredible Burt Wonderstone. In the 2017 Indian Tamil film Bairavaa, the protagonist (Vijay) is shown doing this feat several times throughout the film. Connor, a protagonist in the 2018 game Detroit: Become Human, is shown doing various coin tricks as the player progresses through the game. Actor Val Kilmer can be seen doing the feat in both Tombstone as Doc Holliday and in the movie Real Genius, performing a double-handed continuous hand roll.

== Coin magicians ==
Some magicians widely known for coin magic include:

- Thomas Nelson Downs (considered, along with J.B. Bobo, one of the magicians key to the development and teaching of modern coin magic)
- J.B. Bobo (author of Modern Coin Magic, a core reference and starting point for coin magicians)
- Tony Slydini (a well-known magician whose style of magic transformed close-up magic including his impressive coin routines)
- Dai Vernon (a true innovator and a legend in close-up magic, also known as The Professor)
- Ed Marlo
- David Roth (most important developer of coin magic in the twentieth century and the inventor of the standard plots common in current coin magic)
- Larry Jennings
- Michael Ammar (one of the most prolific publishers and teachers, an experienced all around magician, including coin work)
- Dean Dill (coin magician and inventor who has appeared on television and also works as a barber)
- Michael Vincent
- Shoot Ogawa (Last Vegas restaurant performer known for highly stylized, high-difficulty, impressive coin magic)
- Apollo Robbins (contemporary of Shoot Ogawa and co-contributor to a number of coin teaching materials—also a well-known pickpocket artist)
- David Stone (a talented performer and a teacher of fast-paced, flashy coin magic)
- Rocco Silano (student of Slydini—one of the best utilizers of the "sleeving" technique)
- Jay Sankey (inventor and a teacher of close-up magic from Canada)
- Rich Ferguson (author of Chip Tricks, a magician and a mentalist who has authored various magic instructional videos)
- Luis Piedrahita
- Michael Rubinstein
- Mike Gallo
- Paul Cummins
- Ryan Hayashi

== Performance ==
Although some coin magic use gimmicks (e.g. modified coins or trick coins), such gimmicks usually do not entirely create the magical effect. Gimmicked coins are made by several major manufacturers, such as Sterling, Johnson, Sasco or Tango Magic. Producing a memorable mystery requires significant skill in presenting the effect and utilizing misdirection to distract the audience from the secret of the gimmick. A performer who relies entirely on special equipment may not impress an audience. Many people are more impressed by an effect which depends (or seems to depend) entirely on skillful manipulation and misdirection than by an effect which appears to depend to some extent on specially made props. A performer who has mastered the basic skills can nonetheless use gimmicks to amplify the effect without it being obvious to the audience. Some prefer not to use gimmicks at all, though most well-known coin magicians do use simple coin gimmicks.

== In literature ==
Canadian novelist Robertson Davies devotes a good part of his Deptford Trilogy to the art of coin magic. All three novels follow in part or wholly the career of a fictitious magician, Magnus Eisengrim, who was abducted as a boy by a traveling circus and learned his craft while concealed in a papier-mâché automaton. The descriptions of coin magic throughout are remarkable for their clarity. The final novel in the series, World of Wonders, details his life and career.

In the Neil Gaiman novel American Gods, the main character, Shadow, is experienced in coin magic, and many different tricks and aspects of coin magic are discussed in the book.

In the Dean Koontz novel From the Corner of His Eye, a police officer uses coin magic to interrogate suspects.

In Stephen King's Dark Tower series of novels, the gunslinger Roland Deschain uses the coin roll, albeit substituting a bullet, to induce a hypnotic state in those concentrating on the object's movement across his knuckles.

Thieves, wizards, and jesters, in historical and fantasy literature are often depicted as being skilled in sleight of hand, and are often depicted doing standard coin magic. Rolling a coin across the knuckles (coin roll) is a popular image. Silk in David Eddings's Belgariad, and Mat Cauthon and Thom Merrilin in Robert Jordan's The Wheel of Time do this frequently. Johnny Depp's whimsical character Jack Sparrow coin rolls in the end of Pirates of the Caribbean. Also, Vila Restal in the BBC science fiction television program Blake's 7 mixed his skills as a thief with such tricks.

== See also ==
- Pen spinning
