= Difference model =

Theory in sociolinguistics

The difference model is a theory of gendered differences in language which sees men and women as inhabiting different 'sub-cultures', resulting in different genderlects (sociolects associated with gender). A major proponent of the model, Deborah Tannen, summarised these differences as contrasting conversational goals: men, she argues, tend towards a "report style," focused on communicating factual information, whereas women tend towards a "rapport style," focused on building and maintaining relationships. The difference model is often contrasted with dominance/deficit and dynamic (a.k.a. social constructionist) models.

== Theory ==
The difference model has roots in the studies of John Gumperz, who examined differences in cross-cultural communication. While the difference model deals with cross-gender communication, the male and female genders are often presented as being two separate cultures, hence the relevance of Gumperz's studies. In her development of the difference theory, Deborah Tannen drew on the work of Daniel Maltz and Ruth Borker, in particular their 1982 paper, A Cultural Approach to Male-Female Miscommunication, which itself drew on the work of Gumperz. Mary Talbot makes reference to the term "gender-specific culture" in her critique of the difference model, and this idea of genders being culturally separated is embodied by the 1992 publication of John Gray's Men Are from Mars, Women Are from Venus.

The reason for the popularity of Tannen's book You Just Don't Understand, and the resultant popularization of the difference model, is generally attributed to the style of Tannen's work, in which she adopts a neutral position on differences in genderlect by making no value-judgements about use of language by either gender. Talbot comments that this means the book provides explanations for domestic disputes without "pointing the finger" at anyone.

Difference theory as postulated by Tannen is generally summarised into six categories, each of which pairs contrasting uses of language by males and females.

=== Status v. support ===
Tannen states that, for men, the world is a competitive place in which conversation and speech are used to build status, whereas for women the world is a network of connections, and that they use language to seek and offer support. In demonstrating this, Tannen uses the example of her husband and herself, who at one point had jobs in different cities. She remarks that whenever someone commented on this, she interpreted it as being an offer of sympathy or support. Her husband, on the other hand, took such comments as being criticisms and attempts to put him down. Tannen remarks that this displays the different approaches that women and men take in terms of status and support. Furthermore, men are also more likely to interrupt to get their point across and hence gain status.

=== Advice v. Understanding ===
Women seek comfort and sympathy for their problems, whilst men will seek a solution to the problem.

=== Information v. feelings ===
Tannen states that men's conversation is message-oriented, i.e. based upon communicating information. For women, conversation is much more important for building relationships and strengthening social links.

=== Orders v. proposals ===
Men will use direct imperatives ("close the door", "switch on the light") when speaking to others. Women encourage the use of superpolite forms ("let's", "would you mind if ...?").

=== Conflict v. compromise ===
Tannen asserts that most women avoid conflict in language at all costs, and instead attempt to resolve disagreements without any direct confrontation, to maintain positive connection and rapport. Men, on the other hand, are more likely to use confrontation as a way of resolving differences and thereby negotiating status. Tannen supports this view by making reference to the work of Walter J. Ong, whose 1981 publication, Fighting for Life, asserts that "expressed adversativeness" is more an element of male culture than female culture. Tannen stresses that both forms of communication are valid ways of creating involvement and forming bonds.

=== Independence v. intimacy ===
The difference model asserts that in general men favour independence, while women are more likely to seek intimacy. Tannen demonstrates this with the example of a husband making a decision without consulting his wife. She theorises that he does so because he doesn't want to feel a loss of independence that would come from saying, "Let me consult this with my wife first." Women, by contrast, like to demonstrate that they have to consult with their partner, as this is seen to be proof of the intimacy of the relationship. Tannen asserts that women, seeing the world as a network of connections and relationships, view intimacy as key to achieving consensus and avoiding the appearance of superiority, whereas men, who are more likely to view the world in terms of status, see independence as being key to establishing their status. Tannen also clarifies that while both men and women seek independence and intimacy, men tend to be focused on the former, while women tend to focus on the latter.
