= John Gray (American author) =

American author and relationship counselor

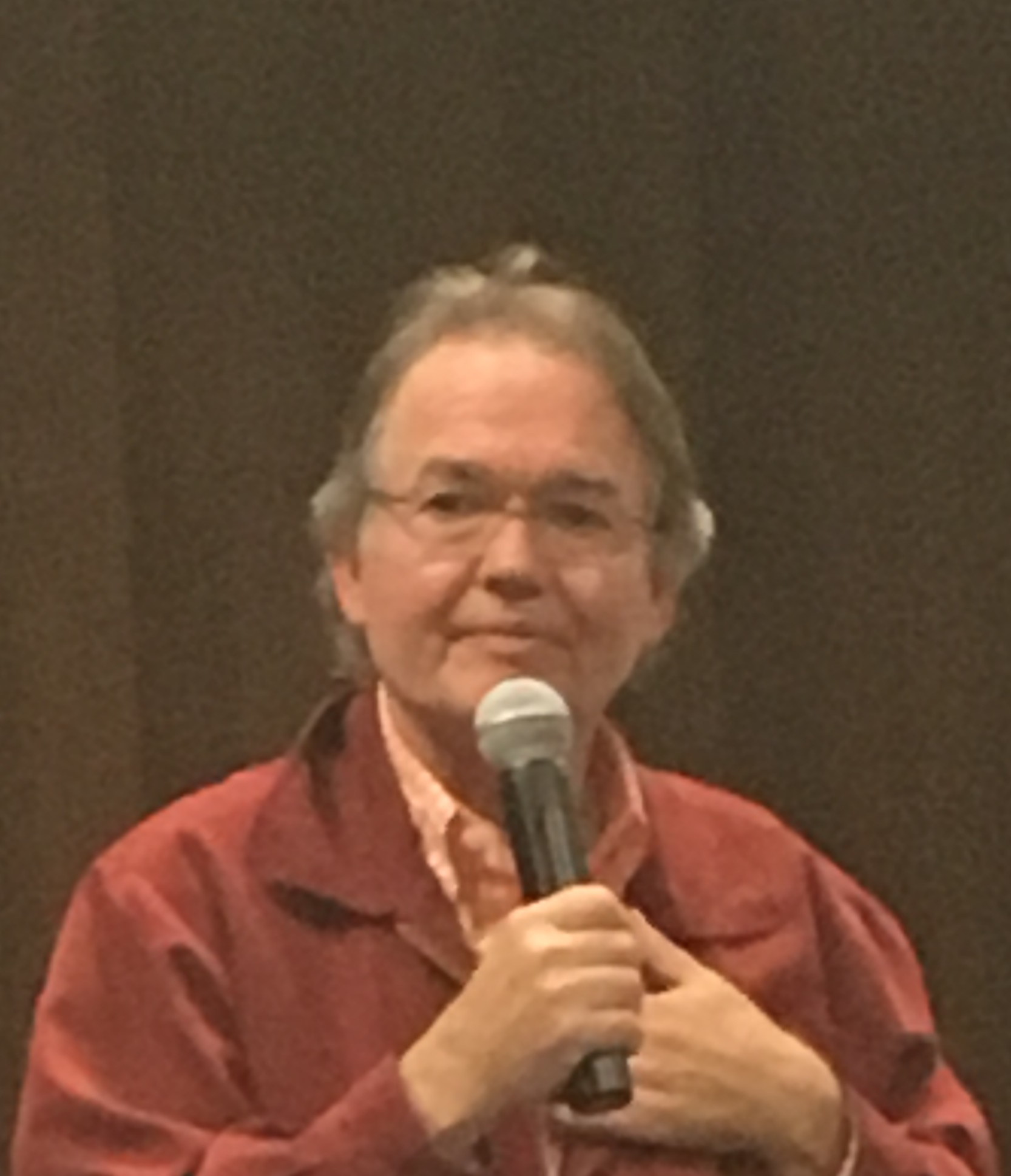
- Gray in 2016
- Born: December 28, 1951 (age 74); Houston, Texas, U.S.
- Education: Maharishi International University, Columbia Pacific University
- Occupation: Author
- Notable work: Men Are from Mars, Women Are from Venus
- Spouse(s): Barbara De Angelis (div. 1984); Bonnie Gray (1986–2018; her death); Wang Lin (Viki) (2020-present)

John Gray (born December 28, 1951) is an American relationship counselor, lecturer, and author. In 1969, he began a nine-year association with Maharishi Mahesh Yogi before beginning his career as an author and personal relationship counselor. In 1992 he published the book Men Are from Mars, Women Are from Venus, which became a long-term best seller and formed the central theme of his subsequent books and career activities. His books have sold millions of copies.

== Early life and education ==
His parents were both Christians and taught him Yoga and took him to visit Indian Saint Yogananda during his childhood. The Autobiography of A Yogi inspired him greatly later in life.

He received a bachelor's and master's degree in the Science of Creative Intelligence, though sources vary on whether these degrees were received from either the non-accredited Maharishi European Research University (MERU) in Switzerland or the accredited Maharishi International University in Fairfield, Iowa.

Gray received an unaccredited (but state-approved) PhD in 1982 from Columbia Pacific University (CPU), a now-defunct distance learning institution. In 2002, he received an honorary doctorate from Governors State University in Illinois after he delivered their commencement address.

== Career ==
In 1969, Gray attended a Transcendental Meditation lecture. He became a celibate and personal assistant to Maharishi Mahesh Yogi for nine years.

=== Publications ===
In 1992, Gray published Men Are from Mars, Women Are from Venus, which has sold more than 15 million copies and, according to a CNN report, it was the "highest ranked work of non-fiction" of the 1990s. The book has been published in more than 40 languages.

=== Business ventures ===
In 1997, Gray began opening Mars & Venus Counseling Centers, where he trains therapists in his "Mars & Venus technique" in exchange for a one-time licensing fee and monthly "royalty payments". Dorothy Cantor, a former president of the American Psychological Association, has questioned the ethics of creating a franchise for what is essentially a therapeutic process.

In 1997, Gray began marketing his products through Genesis Intermedia, a company led by Ramy El-Batrawi. According to their SEC filing, "A substantial portion of our product revenue has come from our Men Are From Mars, Women Are From Venus product series authored by John Gray, Ph.D." On December 31, 1997, Genesis sold 116,504 shares of its common stock to Dr. John Gray for $900,000. On November 1, 1998, 29,126 of those shares were surrendered. Royalties paid to Dr. Gray for the years ended December 31, 1998, 1997 and 1996 were $0, $50,101, and $423,207, respectively. There were no royalties paid to Dr. Gray during the three months ended March 31, 1999 and 1998. in 2004, a massive class action lawsuit was filed against Genesis Intermedia for stock price manipulation. El-Batrawi settled with the SEC and was barred from acting as an officer or director of a public company for a period of five years.

Gray has been marketing dietary supplements through his Web site since at least 2005. In 2019, the U.S. Food and Drug Administration ordered him to stop making illegal claims for several products: 2-AEP Membrane Complex, Ionic Silver Water, L-Glutathione, Liposomal DHA – Ultimate Omega-3 Brain Support, Liposomal Methyl B12/Folate, NAC N-Acetyl-L-Cysteine, and Vectomega.

Gray is also an early investor in YayYo, Inc, a rental car business for the ride-sharing industry operated by Ramy El-Batrawi. Gray owns 21.44% through his Gray Mars Venus Trust. Ramy El-Batrawi dies of undisclosed causes on April 23, 2024.

=== Interviews and appearances ===
Gray has made appeared on multiple talk shows, including Oprah, The Phil Donahue Show, and Larry King Live.

In a June 2014 interview with Agence France-Presse, Gray was quoted as saying with regard to feminism, "The reason why there's so much divorce is that feminism promotes independence in women. I'm very happy for women to find greater independence, but when you go too far in that direction, then who's at home?" He also stated that "feminism in America holds back sales of [his] books", while other parts of the world - he cited Australia and Latin America notably - are more in tune with his basic message. With regard to online pornography Gray stated, "With free internet porn, there's a massive addiction happening," adding that there are "just millions and millions of people... experiencing their sexual satisfactions through total fantasy. The effect that porn has on the brain is like taking heroin." With regard to the rise of infidelity sites like Ashley Madison and Arrangement Finders he states, "When you have impersonal sex.... 'It's OK, here are these cheating wives, men, they want to have sex with you'... So you go have sex with someone that you don't know and someone you don't love... impersonal sex does promote addiction to sex," he adds, "it's along the same line of pornography."

== Criticism ==
In 2002, author Julia T. Wood published a critical response to Gray's portrayals of men and women in Men Are from Mars, Women Are from Venus. In 2007 Deborah Cameron published a book-length critique of Gray, and other self-help ventures premised on gender difference stereotypes, in The Myth of Mars and Venus: Do Men and Women Really Speak Different Languages?

Gray was accused of borrowing from the work of author Deborah Tannen and he acknowledges some similarities but says, "I was teaching those ideas before I'd heard of her" and that he did not read her book. Other critics have accused Gray of limiting human psychology to stereotypes.

== Personal life ==
Gray married self-help author Barbara De Angelis. They divorced in 1984. Gray married his second wife, Bonnie, in 1986; she died of cancer in 2018. Gray married his third wife, Wang Lin, also known as Viki Gray, on May 4, 2020 in Marin County, California. She was his personal guide during his speaking tours in China.

Gray has a daughter and two stepdaughters. His youngest daughter Lauren markets the Mars Venus brand through her own videos on self-help relationship advice.

== Books and other publications ==
- 1992: Men Are from Mars, Women Are from Venus
- 1993: What You Feel You Can Heal
- 1994: What Your Mother Couldn't Tell You and Your Father Didn't Know
- 1994: Mars and Venus in Love
- 1995: Mars and Venus in the Bedroom
- 1997: Mars and Venus on a Date
- 1997: Mars and Venus Starting Over
- 1999: How To Get What You Want and Want What You Have
- 2000: Children Are from Heaven
- 2000: Mars and Venus: 365 Ways to Keep Passion Alive
- Men, Women and Relationships
- Mars and Venus Together Forever: A Practical Guide to Creating Lasting Intimacy
- Men Are from Mars, Women Are from Venus Book of Days
- Practical Miracles for Mars and Venus: Nine Principles for Lasting Love, Increasing Success, and Vibrant Health in the Twenty-first Century
- 2002: Mars and Venus in the Workplace, ISBN 0732911141
- Truly Mars & Venus
- 2003: The Mars & Venus Diet and Exercise Solution
- 2007: Why Mars and Venus Collide: Improving Relationships by Understanding How Men and Women Cope Differently with Stress
- 2010: Venus on Fire, Mars on Ice – Hormonal Balance – The Key to Life, Love, and Energy
- 75 Ways To Say I Love You (co-author Darren Stephens), ISBN 9780957974012
- How To Release Stress Through Relaxation (co-author Darren Stephens), ISBN 9780957974005
- Work with Me: The 8 Blind Spots Between Men and Women in Business (co-author Barbara Annis), ISBN 9780230341906
- 2017: Beyond Mars and Venus

== See also ==
- Essentialism
- Symposium (Plato)#Aristophanes
