= Chink-a-chink =

Magic trick involving coins

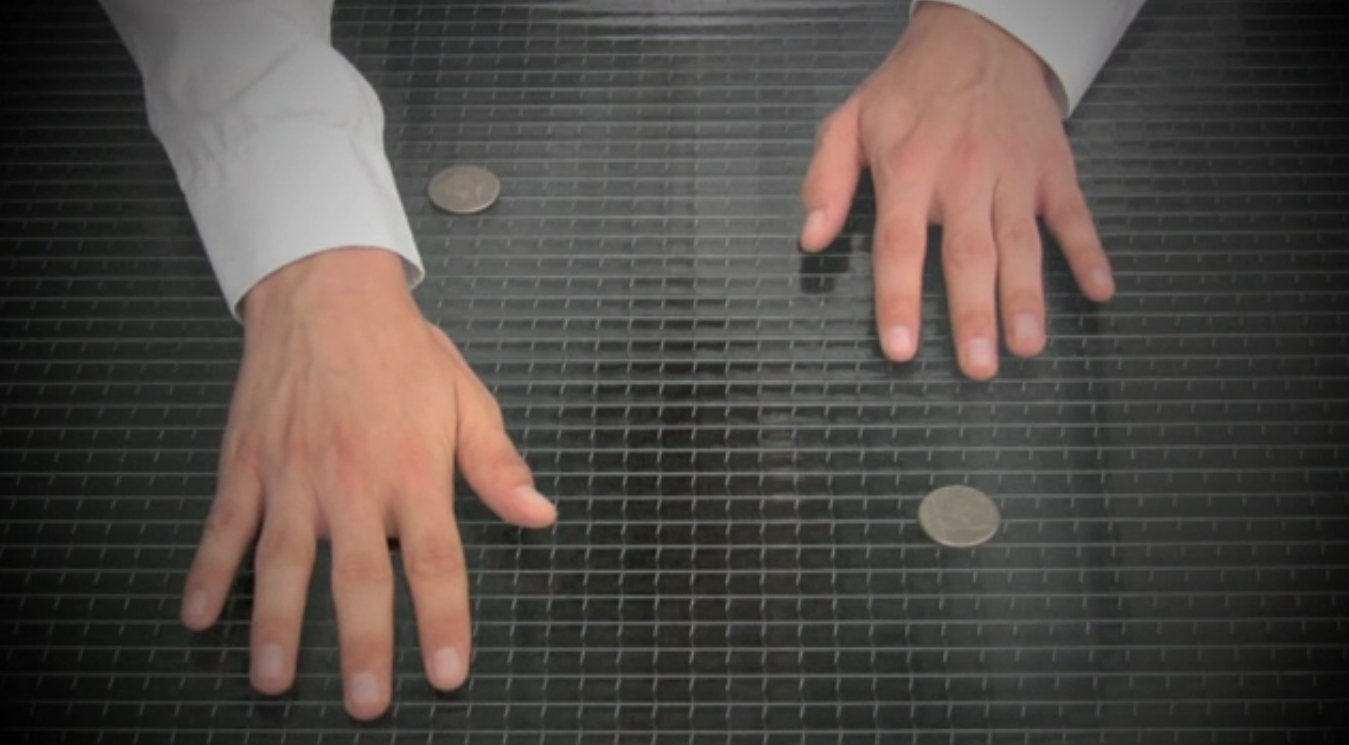
A magician performs the "chink-a-chink" coin trick, having started from a square of four coins.

Chink-a-chink is a simple close-up magic coin trick in which a variety of small objects, usually four, appear to magically transport themselves from location to location when covered by the performer's hands, until the items end up gathered together in the same place. Variations, especially the Sympathetic Coins, also known as Coins-n-Cards, have been performed since the 1800s. Popular modern variations are Shadow Coins and Matrix. A variation using playing cards as the objects is known as Sympathetic Aces.

== Effect ==
In the typical layout, the magician places four small objects on a table in a square, rectangular or diamond formation (although even a single straight line formation is possible). The objects are usually equidistant from each other. The magician then covers any two of the objects with their hands, performs a flourish, and then lifts their hands to reveal that one of the objects has somehow jumped from its original location to join one of the other three objects. The same effect is repeated until all of the objects are gathered together in a single location. Objects most commonly used for the trick are wine corks, dice, bottle caps, brass weights, and coins. A version using coins that are covered by cards is a variation on the same concept, known as "Matrix", credited to the magician Al Schneider.

== History ==
Sean McWeeney, the author of the first dedicated e-book on chink-a-chink, demonstrated that the trick is much older than was previously thought, with a history stretching back to at least early/mid-19th-century Germany. The trick was famously covered in Edwin Sach's seminal book Sleight of Hand in 1877, utilizing four sugar cubes. Yank Hoe is reputed to have performed it as early as 1891, and introduced the name "Sympathetic Coins".

Max Malini, who popularized the trick in the early 20th century, using cut-down wine corks, is generally credited with naming the trick. Although the name was probably meant to be onomatopoetic, it can be interpreted as a racial slur, and, as a result, has been given alternative names.

Leo Horowitz perpetuated Malini's version while adding refinements of his own, using covered sugar cubes of a type popular in supper clubs and night spots in the 1930s, 1940s and 1950s. Doug Henning performed chink-a-chink on television in the early 1970s, using seashells. Dutch magicians Fred Kaps and Tommy Wonder were also associated with the trick.

Pre-fabricated chink-a-chink sets are available on order from various magic-makers, including Auke van Dokkum of the Netherlands, François Danis of France and Jim Riser of the US. Professional magicians, however, generally prefer the traditional "found objects" (such as corks and bottle caps) to the artificial ones, reducing demand for the purpose-built sets.

== Description ==
Chink-a-chink involves sleight of hand along with one extra object of whatever sort is being used. To start the trick, four of the objects are arranged on the table while the fifth is palmed. The magician places their hands over two of the objects on the table and performs some flourish to cover movement. During the flourish, the previously-palmed fifth object is dropped, while the object under the empty hand is palmed. This leaves the newly palmed object in the opposite hand of the original. The magician then switches their hands so the other hand, with the newly lifted object, is held over the pile, and the process is repeated. Sachs' gives a complete list of suggested moves to achieve this alternating motion. When the pile is completely constructed, one object is still in the magician's hand, which is then pocketed or simply dropped in their lap.

The Matrix variations on the basic trick use playing cards to cover the coins instead of the magician's hands. The trick is otherwise identical, although in some cases there is no fifth coin, and instead one of the coins is picked up during what appears to be a pre-trick explanation. The location of the missing coin is covered by dropping the other card on that location and leaving it there. A handkerchief is sometimes used to provide a temporary holding area for the extra coin. Alternation takes place by handing the playing card from hand to hand between drops, or alternating hands to lift the card covering the growing pile. Sympathetic Aces is a variation using four cards, the aces, in place of coins.

== Variants ==
=== Sympathetic Coins ===
Sympathetic Coins was invented by Yank Hoe and was first performed in 1891. Another variation is called "Shadow Coins".

=== Matrix ===
Matrix is a close-up magic coin and card trick developed in 1960 by magician Al Schneider, in which four coins are placed under four cards then the coins appear to magically teleport from one card to another until all four coins are under one card. The trick is a variation of chink-a-chink.

Four coins appear to be set under four cards, which are placed in a square. In the process of placing the coins, the magician uses sleight of hand to steal a coin from under one card and place it under a different card, giving the illusion that the coin has invisibly jumped from one card to another. While picking up other cards, the magician repeatedly slips a stolen coin under a selected card, until all four coins are under the same card.

It was published in 1970 in Genii 1970 November. Fellow magician Karrell Fox suggested calling the trick "Al-ternating Coins"; however, Schneider decided on "Matrix" due to his math background.

Close-up magician Ryan Hayashi created a more advanced version of the trick, which he calls "Ultimate Matrix", in which part of the trick is performed with one hand.
