= Lick the Plate =

American foodie radio show

Lick the Plate is a food based radio show that is featured on The River in Detroit, and 102.1 KPRI in San Diego. It is hosted by David Boylan who has interviewed over 300 chefs, restaurateurs, growers, brewers and culinary personalities over the past 5 years. Lick the Plate's unique format endeavors for the radio audience to get to know the culinary talent behind their favorite restaurants.

Besides their culinary background and experience, guests share the road to their current position, music memories and dream concert lineup, where they eat and drink around town, last supper and an in-depth look at their current menu or business. This has proven to be popular with both the culinary community and foodies alike. Lick the Plate is also a weekly column in the Coast News, a North County San Diego weekly newspaper since 2008.

David Boylan's conversational interview style puts his guests at ease and elicits stories that listeners eat up. Besides the top culinary talent in San Diego and Detroit, he has interviewed the mayor of San Diego, musicians, and other notable personalities who have a culinary stories to tell.
