= Ehoron.com =

- Website type: An online forum for ethnic Mongolian students
- Founded: September 2004
- Dissolved: 26 September 2005
- Website: www.ehoron.com
- Current status: Shut down

Ehoron.com ("ehoron" means "homeland" in English) was an Inner Mongolia-based online discussion forum for Mongolian students. It was established in September 2004. It allowed students to discuss many topics affecting Inner Mongolia.

== Shut down ==
Ehoron.com was shut down by the Chinese government on 26 September 2005, for "allegedly hosting separatist content".
