= Merlin (musical) =

- Broadway Playbill cover
- Music: Elmer Bernstein
- Lyrics: Don Black
- Book: Richard Levinson; William Link
- Productions: 1983 Broadway

Merlin is a musical based on a concept by popular illusionist Doug Henning and Barbara De Angelis, written by Richard Levinson and William Link, with music (and incidental music) written by Elmer Bernstein and lyrics by Don Black.

== Synopsis ==
The story focuses on the legendary wizard Merlin, not as an elderly man as he is usually depicted, but as a young apprentice still learning the rules of magic. Merlin must overcome the evil Queen and her attempts to install her son Fergus as the King of England over the rightful future King Arthur.

=== Magic tricks ===
During the production number "Put a Little Magic in Your Life", Henning mounted a white horse and rode it into a gigantic box, which was then closed and hoisted into the air above the stage. In midair, the box suddenly broke open, turning out to be empty. A moment later, Henning appeared at the opposite edge of the stage, still mounted on a horse. In another scene, Henning levitated and flew above the stage with no visible support. Anticipating the audience's suspicion that Henning was hanging on invisible wires, the set design for this scene included several large Stonehenge-like trilithons: Henning levitated beneath the lintels of these structures, which would have caught any wires hanging above him. In a battle sequence, Rivera's villainess character and her minions, in full view of the audience, assembled several large pieces of armor into a giant warrior, which immediately began walking and wielding a sword even though the armor had no discernible human occupant.

== Original cast and characters ==
Character	Broadway (1983)
Merlin	Doug Henning
The Queen	Chita Rivera
Prince Fergus	Nathan Lane
Philomena	Rebecca Wright
Arthur / Young Merlin	Christian Slater
Ariadne	Michelle Nicastro
Old Merlin	George Lee Andrews
The Wizard	Edmund Lyndeck
The Queen's Companion	Gregory Mitchell
Acolyte	Alan Brasington
Merlin's Vision	Debby Henning

== Song list ==
Act I

- "It's About Magic" – Old Merlin, Young Merlin, Merlin, Philomena and Ensemble
- "I Can Make It Happen" – The Queen
- "Beyond My Wildest Dreams" – Ariadne
- "Something More" – Merlin and Ariadne
- "The Elements" – Merlin, Wizard and Ensemble
- "Fergus' Dilemma" – Prince Fergus and Ladies of the Court
- "Nobody Will Remember him" – The Queen and Wizard

Act II

- "Put A Little Magic In Your Life" – Old Merlin, Merlin, Philomena and Ensemble
- "He Who Knows The Way" – Wizard
- "I Can Make It Happen" (Reprise) – The Queen
- "He Who Knows The Way" (Reprise) – Wizard
- "We Haven't Fought a Battle in Years" – Prince Fergus and Soldiers
- "Satan Rules" – The Queen
- "Nobody Will Remember Him" (Reprise) – The Queen
- "He Who Knows the Way" (Reprise) – Merlin, Wizard and Arthur

== Production history ==
Merlin opened on Broadway at the Mark Hellinger Theatre on February 13, 1983 and closed on August 7, 1983 after 199 performances and 69 previews. It was directed by Ivan Reitman and choreographed by Christopher Chadman and Billy Wilson. The cast included Henning as Merlin, Chita Rivera as an evil sorceress and, in supporting roles, newcomer Nathan Lane, and a young Christian Slater.

The show was not a critical or financial success, failing to recoup its estimated production budget of $4–6 million. It is remembered today chiefly because of the number of "preview" performances it played: while most shows play a month or so prior to inviting critics and having an official opening, Merlin had 69, never inviting the critics and postponing the opening three times, despite charging full ticket prices. During the musical's troubled previews, the original director (Frank Dunlop) was replaced by co-producer Reitman, while choreographer Billy Wilson was added to augment Chadman's work. At least four songs were cut during previews, including "These Are Not the Merriest of Days" which was replaced by "Put a Little Magic in Your Life".

== Critical reception ==
Frank Rich of The New York Times wrote that the main draw of Merlin was Henning's "spectacular" illusions. Rich also found Theoni V. Aldredge's costumes to be "imaginative," albeit trying too hard to be like those in Cats and Star Wars at times. He panned the other aspects of the musical, particularly Henning's acting, singing and dancing. Overall, he felt that Merlin would have worked better as a magic show than as a musical.

== Awards and nominations ==
=== Original Broadway production ===
Year	Award	Category	Nominee	Result
1983	Tony Award	Best Musical		Nominated
1983	Tony Award	Best Book of a Musical	Richard Levinson and William Link	Nominated
1983	Tony Award	Best Original Score	Elmer Bernstein and Don Black	Nominated
1983	Tony Award	Best Performance by a Leading Actress in a Musical	Chita Rivera	Nominated
1983	Tony Award	Best Direction of a Musical	Ivan Reitman	Nominated
1983	Drama Desk Award	Outstanding Featured Actress in a Musical	Rebecca Wright	Nominated
1983	Drama Desk Award	Outstanding Special Effects	Doug Henning, Charles Reynolds, Glen Priest, Jim Steinmeyer, John Gaughan & Robin Wagner	Nominated
