= Stanyon =

Stanyon is a surname. Notable people with the surname include:

- Bryan Stanyon (born 1941), British actor
- Ellis Stanyon (1870–1951), British magician
