= Coins through table =

Magic trick

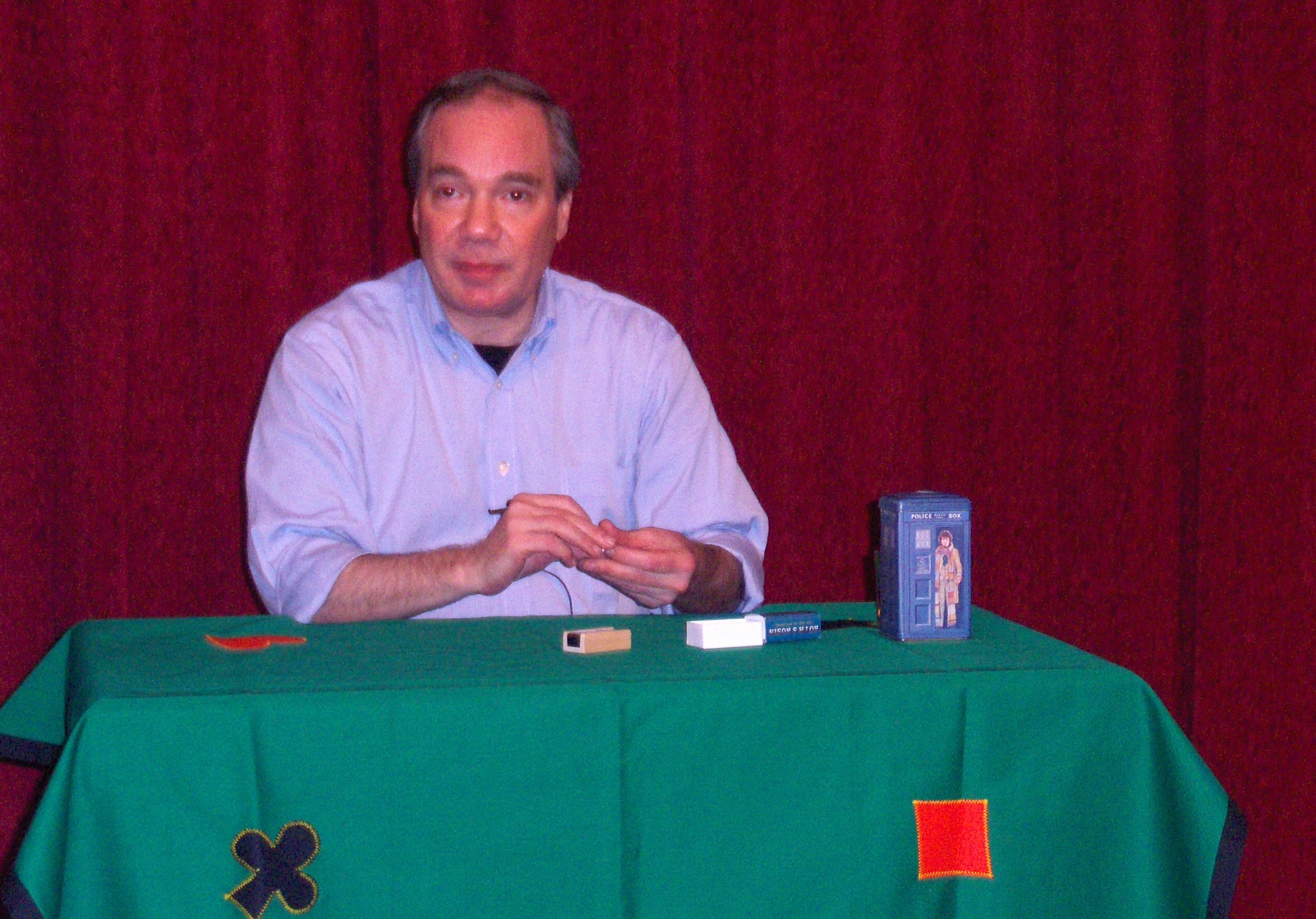
David Roth, considered to be the finest coin magician of his time, is a well known practitioner of Coins Through Table

Coins through table is considered to be a classic of coin magic, where a magician appears to make coins penetrate a table. Being one of the most popular forms of coin magic, it is described in many magic books with many variations.

== Effect ==
Usually the magician is seated at the table with the spectators. In most variations, there are several coins (though, some simpler versions involve a single coin) that appear to be passed directly through the table, with some variations involving passing several coins one by one while others involve passing several or all at once. Because some variations of this trick are impromptu, David Roth recommends this trick as part of dinner table magic. The effect is described, with several variations in J. B. Bobo's book, Modern Coin Magic. And in his eponymous book, Mark Wilson discusses a specific variation of this trick which uses a gimmick. In his show, Mindfreak, Criss Angel demonstrates a version of this trick, which utilizes a single coin, and then teaches it to the audience.
