= Troublewit =

Type of paper

Troublewit is a specially pleated paper used for entertainment purposes. The paper is used to form various items, such as hats, fans and umbrellas by stage entertainers and illusionists.

Its origins go back at least to the 17th century. The method of preparing the paper was described in English as early as 1676 by the anonymous author "J.M." in "Sports and Pastimes" but was said to be performed by a French monk "Pere Mathieu". British magic dealer Ellis Stanyon sold the folded papers ready-made and included a routine in his 1905 book, "Magic: or Conjuring for Amateurs," and an outstanding, photographically-illustrated routine was included in C. Lang Neil's "The Modern Conjurer" (1903). Houdini mentioned the novelty in his 1922 book "Paper Magic."

According to Stanyon, "The groundwork of the paper-folding is not by any means new, having been known for several hundred years at least under various names, as: "Chinese Fan," "Fantastic Fan," "Trouble Wit," etc." According to Houdini, Monsieur Felicien Trewey presented it throughout Europe and America under the name of "Papier Multiforme." The late Canadian magician Sid Lorraine claimed some credit for re-popularizing the novelty by working out updated routines for it and performing it at magicians' conventions, and he included a routine in his 1950 book "More Patter."

The accordion-style creasing pattern allows the stiff paper to be compressed into a small space for transport, and yet transformed into, according to Stanyon, over one hundred different shapes during a performance, with an accompanying story. Despite its age, the entertainment is still a distinct novelty to most audiences.
