= Mars and Venus in the Bedroom =

Book by John Gray

- Author: John Gray
- Original title: Mars and Venus in the Bedroom: a Guide to Lasting Romance and Passion
- Language: English
- Subject: Relationships
- Published: HarperCollins
- Pages: 400
- ISBN: 0061015717
- OCLC: 1023398262

Mars and Venus in the Bedroom: A Guide to Lasting Romance and Passion is a 1995 self-help relationship based book written by John Gray, author of Men Are from Mars, Women Are from Venus. It is part in a series of books exploring the oft-clashing relationships between men and women.

Mars and Venus in the Bedroom reached number 4 on the Wall Street Journal best seller list. It debuted on the New York Times best seller list at number 4. It was the number 7 top-seller for 1995, selling more than 680,000 copies.

== Synopsis ==
John Gray brings his theories to enhancing the relationship in the bedroom and teaches his readers how to employ "advanced relationship skills" to create deeper intimacy while maintaining the passionate spark that was part of the couple's initial relationship. What he believes is that the first step to achieving this is an acceptance of the differences between the sexes. Once there is acceptance, it is easier for the couple to make small but significant changes in attitudes, techniques, etc. The theory is that this will then result in a rekindling of passion.

== Reviews ==
Ray Olson in Booklist wrote "Gray's a plain, even pedestrian, writer, capable of talking about sex in a manner neither lubricious nor clinical".

The Publishers Weekly reviewer criticized the book for failing to discuss safe sex.

Valerie Peterson, PhD, in the Women and Language journal, identifies the book as "polarized and conservative", observing that it fit into the 1990s movement "to restore sexual and social norms of bygone days". She notes that it is repetitive and poorly organized. Peterson predicts, "Gray's ideas will lose sway either because its scripts and metaphors can no longer adequately address a situation characterized by a relative increase in the power of women, or because some different understanding of sexuality will appear and usurp the cultural imaginary."
