= Yank Hoe =

- Born: Ercole Castagnone c. 1864; Turin, Italy
- Died: unknown
- Years active: 1885–1907
- Known for: Juggler; Magician

Yank Hoe (born Ercole Castagnone c. 1864 – unknown) was an Italian magician known for performing the trick "Card through Cigarette" and inventing "Sympathetic Coins" also known as "Coins-n-Cards". Hoe began performing in London at the Trocadero in December 1885.

== Biography ==
Hoe started as a juggler and magician. He began his professional magic career in 1883, when he became a manager of an unidentified Japanese juggling troupe.

In 1886, he worked with Nadine Osborne also known as Omene who was a London girl that acted as his assistant until 1892. She began a solo career in "exotic dancing" and later became a magician as well. After their split, Yank Hoe continued to perform mainly as a juggler, rather than magician.

Hoe stage act employed mentalism, juggling and magic. John Northern Hilliard recorded some of Hoe's tricks in Thomas Nelson Downs' The Art of Magic.

Hoe's trick "Sympathetic Coins" was published in The Art of Magic which later evolve into the modern variation known as Matrix, developed by Al Schneider in 1960.
