= The Myth of Mars and Venus =

2008 book by Deborah Cameron

The Myth of Mars and Venus: Do Men and Women Really Speak Different Languages?
- First edition (September 2008)
- Author: Deborah Cameron
- Language: English
- Genre: Non-fiction; Relationships; Psychology; Self-help
- Publisher: Oxford University Press
- Publication date: 11 September 2008
- Publication place: United Kingdom
- Pages: 196
- ISBN: 9780199550999

The Myth of Mars and Venus: Do Men and Women Really Speak Different Languages? is a book by Deborah Cameron that was originally released in the autumn of 2008, which was published by Oxford University Press. The title refers to the central conceit of the book by John Gray of January 1992, Men Are from Mars, Women Are from Venus, which Cameron’s book is (partially) the response to.

== Details ==
Cameron argues that "what linguistic differences there are, between men and women, are driven, by the need to construct and project personal meaning, and identity." She challenges "the idea that sex differences might have biological rather than social causes" as being more motivated by the reaction to politically correct attitudes than being derived from basic research. The book argues that there is as much similarity and variation within each gender as there is between men and women. Cameron concludes there is a need to think about gender in more complex ways than the prevailing myths and stereotypes allow.

== See also ==
- Difference model
