= Compulsive talking =

Personality trait

Compulsive talking (or talkaholism) is talking that goes beyond the bounds of what is considered to be socially acceptable. The main criteria for determining if someone is a compulsive talker are talking in a continuous manner or stopping only when the other person starts talking, and others perceiving their talking as a problem. Personality traits that have been positively linked to this compulsion include assertiveness, willingness to communicate, self-perceived communication competence, and neuroticism. Studies have shown that most people who are talkaholics are aware of the amount of talking they do, but are unable to stop or do not see it as a problem.

== Characteristics ==
It has been suggested, through research done by James C. McCroskey and Virginia P. Richmond, that American society finds talkativeness attractive. It is something which is rewarded and is positively correlated with leadership and influence. However, those who compulsively talk are not to be confused with those who are simply highly verbal and vary their quantity of talk. Compulsive talkers are those who are highly verbal in a manner that differs greatly from the norm and is not in the person's best interest. Those who have been characterized as compulsive talkers talk with a greater frequency, dominate conversations, and are less inhibited than others. They have also been found to be more argumentative and have a positive attitude regarding communication. Tendencies towards compulsive talking also are more frequently seen in the personality structure of neurotic psychotic extraverts. It has also been found that talkaholics are never behaviorally shy.

== Talkaholic scale ==
In 1993 James C. McCroskey and Virginia P. Richmond constructed the Talkaholic Scale, a Likert-type model, to help identify those who are compulsive talkers. A score of 40 or above, which indicates two standard deviations above the norm, would signal someone to be a true talkaholic.

=== Cultural similarities ===
A study of 811 university students in the United States found 5.2% had results indicating they were talkaholics. A similar study of students from New Zealand found similar results, with 4.7% scoring above 40.

== Consequences and management ==
Compulsive talking can drive people away, which in turn can leave that person with no social support. Interrupting, another act that is associated with talkaholics, can signal to other people a lack of respect.

According to Elizabeth Wagele, an author of best-selling books on personality types, there are different ways to handle compulsive talkers. Such coping techniques include changing the focus of the conversation, taking attention away from the talkaholic, leaving the conversation, and creating a distraction.

In Daniel Lyons's book STFU: The Power of Keeping Your Mouth Shut in an Endlessly Noisy World, the author's journey begins with his own realization that he is suffering from compulsive talking. In the book, he interviews experts. who outline effective treatment for the condition.

== See also ==
- Chatterbox
- Compulsive behavior
- Compulsive lying
- Conversation
- Tourette syndrome
