= Deborah Cameron (linguist) =

British linguist (1958–2026)

- Born: Deborah Jane Cameron; 10 November 1958; Glasgow, Scotland
- Died: 20 January 2026 (aged 67)

Academic work
- Main interests: Sociolinguistics and linguistic anthropology
- Notable works: The Myth of Mars and Venus: Do Men and Women Really Speak Different Languages?

Deborah Jane Cameron (10 November 1958 – 20 January 2026) was a British linguist and feminist who held the Rupert Murdoch Professorship in Language and Communication at Worcester College, Oxford University.

Cameron was mainly interested in sociolinguistics and linguistic anthropology. A large part of her academic research was focused on the relationship of language to gender and sexuality. She wrote the book The Myth of Mars And Venus: Do Men and Women Really Speak Different Languages?, which was published in 2007.

== Life and career ==
Before her post at Oxford University, Cameron taught at the Roehampton Institute of Higher Education, The College of William & Mary in Virginia, Strathclyde University in Glasgow and the Institute of Education in London.

Cameron died from pancreatic cancer on 20 January 2026, at the age of 67.

== Selected bibliography ==
=== Books ===
- Cameron, Deborah (1985). Feminism and Linguistic Theory. London Basingstoke: Macmillan. ISBN 0-333-37077-5.
- Cameron, Deborah; Frazer, Elizabeth (1987). The lust to kill: a feminist investigation of sexual murder. New York: New York University Press. ISBN 9780814714157.
- Cameron, Deborah; Frazer, Elizabeth; Harvey, Penelope; Rampton, M.B.H.; Richardson, Kay (1992). Researching language: issues of power and method. London New York: Routledge. ISBN 9780415057226.
- Cameron, Deborah (1995). Verbal hygiene (1st ed.). London New York: Routledge. ISBN 9780415103558.
- Cameron, Deborah (2012). Verbal hygiene. Classics in Linguistics (Reprint ed.). London New York: Routledge. ISBN 9780415696005.
- Cameron, Deborah (2000). Good to talk? Living and working in a communication culture. London Thousand Oaks, California: SAGE. ISBN 9781412931557.
- Cameron, Deborah (2001). Working with spoken discourse. London Thousand Oaks, California: SAGE. ISBN 9780761957737.
- Cameron, Deborah; Block, David (2002). Globalization and language teaching. London New York: Routledge. ISBN 9780203193679.
- Cameron, Deborah; Markus, Thomas A. (2002). The words between the spaces: buildings and language. London New York: Routledge. ISBN 9780203360361.
- Cameron, Deborah; Kulick, Don (2003). Language and sexuality. Cambridge: Cambridge University Press. ISBN 9780511791178.
- Cameron, Deborah; Kulick, Don (2006). The language and sexuality reader. London New York: Routledge. ISBN 9780203013373.
- Cameron, Deborah (2006). On language and sexual politics. London New York: Routledge. ISBN 9780415373432.
- Cameron, Deborah (2007). The myth of Mars and Venus: Do men and women really speak different languages?. Oxford New York: Oxford University Press. ISBN 9780199214471.
- Cameron, Deborah; Scanlon, Joan (2010). The Trouble & Strife reader. London New York: Bloomsbury Academic. ISBN 9781849660129.
- Cameron, Deborah (2012). More heat than light?: Sex-difference science & the study of language. Vancouver: Ronsdale Press. ISBN 9781553802211.
- Cameron, Deborah; Panović, Ivan (2014). Working with written discourse. London Thousand Oaks, California: SAGE. ISBN 9781446267226.
- Cameron, Deborah; Shaw, Sylvia (2016). Gender, Power, and Political Speech: Women and language in the 2015 UK General Election. London: Palgrave Macmillan. ISBN 978-1-137-58751-0.
- Cameron, Deborah (2025). The Rise of Dogwhistle Politics. Cambridge: Polity Press. ISBN 9-781509-569007.

=== Chapters in books ===
- Cameron, Deborah; Frazer, Elizabeth (1996), "The murderer as misogynist?", in Jackson, Stevi; Scott, Sue (eds.), Feminism and sexuality: a reader, New York: Columbia University Press, pp. 207–215, ISBN 9780231107082.
- Cameron, Deborah; Frazer, Elizabeth (1996), "On the question of pornography and sexual violence: moving beyond cause and effect", in Jackson, Stevi; Scott, Sue (eds.), Feminism and sexuality: a reader, New York: Columbia University Press, pp. 321–332, ISBN 9780231107082.
- Cameron, Deborah (2011), ""The virtues of good prose": verbal hygiene and the movement", in Leader, Zachary (ed.), The movement reconsidered: essays on Larkin, Amis, Gunn, Davie, and their contemporaries, Oxford: Oxford University Press, pp. 139–154, ISBN 9780199601844.

=== Journal articles ===
- Cameron, Deborah (July 1990). "Ten years on: "Compulsory heterosexuality and lesbian existence"". Women: A Cultural Review. 1 (1): 35–37. doi:10.1080/09574049008578015. (See also: Rich, Adrienne (Summer 1980). "Compulsory heterosexuality and lesbian existence". Signs: Journal of Women in Culture and Society. 5 (4): 631–660. doi:10.1086/493756. JSTOR 3173834. S2CID 143604951. and Compulsory Heterosexuality and Lesbian Existence)
- Cameron, Deborah (May 2010). "Sex/gender, language and the new biologism". Applied Linguistics. 31 (2): 173–192. doi:10.1093/applin/amp022.
- Cameron, Deborah (February 2011). "Evolution, science and the study of literature: A critical response". Language and Literature. 20 (1): 59–72. doi:10.1177/0963947010391126. S2CID 147650548.
- Cameron, Deborah (2013). "The one, the many and the other: representing mono- and multilingualism in post-9/11 verbal hygiene". Critical Multilingualism Studies. 1 (2): 59–77.
- Cameron, Deborah; Holoshitz, Tamar (June 2014). "The linguistic representation of sexual violence in conflict settings". Gender and Language. 8 (2): 169–184. doi:10.1558/genl.v8i2.169.
- Cameron, Deborah (2021) "Women, Civility, and the Language of Politics: Realities and representations" The Political Quarterly 1-7
