= Tenkai palm =

Card magic technique

The Tenkai palm is a card magic technique used to palm a card. It was invented by the Japanese magician Tenkai, whose real name was Teijiro Ishida (1889–1972). The Tenkai palm has many applications in card magic, as well as other manipulative magic with objects of a similar size, such as jumbo coins. Additionally, the Tenkai palm allows a great deal of freedom in the methods of concealing and revealing.
