= That's Not What I Meant! =

1987 book by Deborah Tannen

That's Not What I MEANT! How Conversational Style Makes or Breaks Relationships
- Author: Deborah Tannen
- Language: English
- Subject: Relationships
- Genre: Nonfiction
- Publisher: Ballantine Books
- Publication date: March 12, 1987
- English publication date: March 12, 1987
- Pages: 224
- ISBN: 978-0-345-34090-0

That's Not What I Meant! How Conversational Style Makes or Breaks Relationships is Deborah Tannen's first book presenting, for a general audience, her linguistic approach to explaining how ways of speaking affect relationships. This book approaches communication and miscommunication from a linguistic point of view rather than a psychological one, emphasizing differences between the genders. The book lays out the linguistic devices and rituals that constitute "conversational style", such as indirectness, pacing, pausing, humor, overlap, and interruption, and shows their effects when styles differ. Tannen contrasted her book with Suzette Haden Elgin's The Gentle Art of Verbal Self-Defense series by saying, "Hers is sort of a verbal war manual. Mine is about verbal peacemaking".

== See also ==
- Men Are from Mars, Women Are from Venus
- Nonverbal communication
