= A Complete Collection of Genteel and Ingenious Conversation =

18th-century book by Jonathan Swift

A Complete Collection of genteel and ingenious Conversation, according to the most polite mode and method now used at Court, and in the best Companies of England, commonly known as A Complete Collection of Genteel and Ingenious Conversation, or more simply as Polite Conversation, is a book by Jonathan Swift offering an ironic and satirical commentary on the perceived banality of conversation among the upper classes in early-18th century Great Britain. It is written in the form of a reference guide for those lacking in conversational skill. The book was completed in 1731, but may have been conceived of as early as 1704. One of Swift's last works, it was written in between bouts of vertigo and was not presented for publication until 1738.

Bergen Evans calls it "a tissue of moth-eaten phrases, worn-out wisecracks, musty proverbs and threadbare sententiousness".
