= Conversation =

Interactive communication between two or more people

Conversation is interactive communication between two or more people. The development of conversational skills and etiquette is an important part of socialization. The development of conversational skills in a new language is a frequent focus of language teaching and learning. Conversation analysis is a branch of sociology which studies the structure and organization of human interaction, with a more specific focus on conversational interaction.

== Definition and characterizations ==
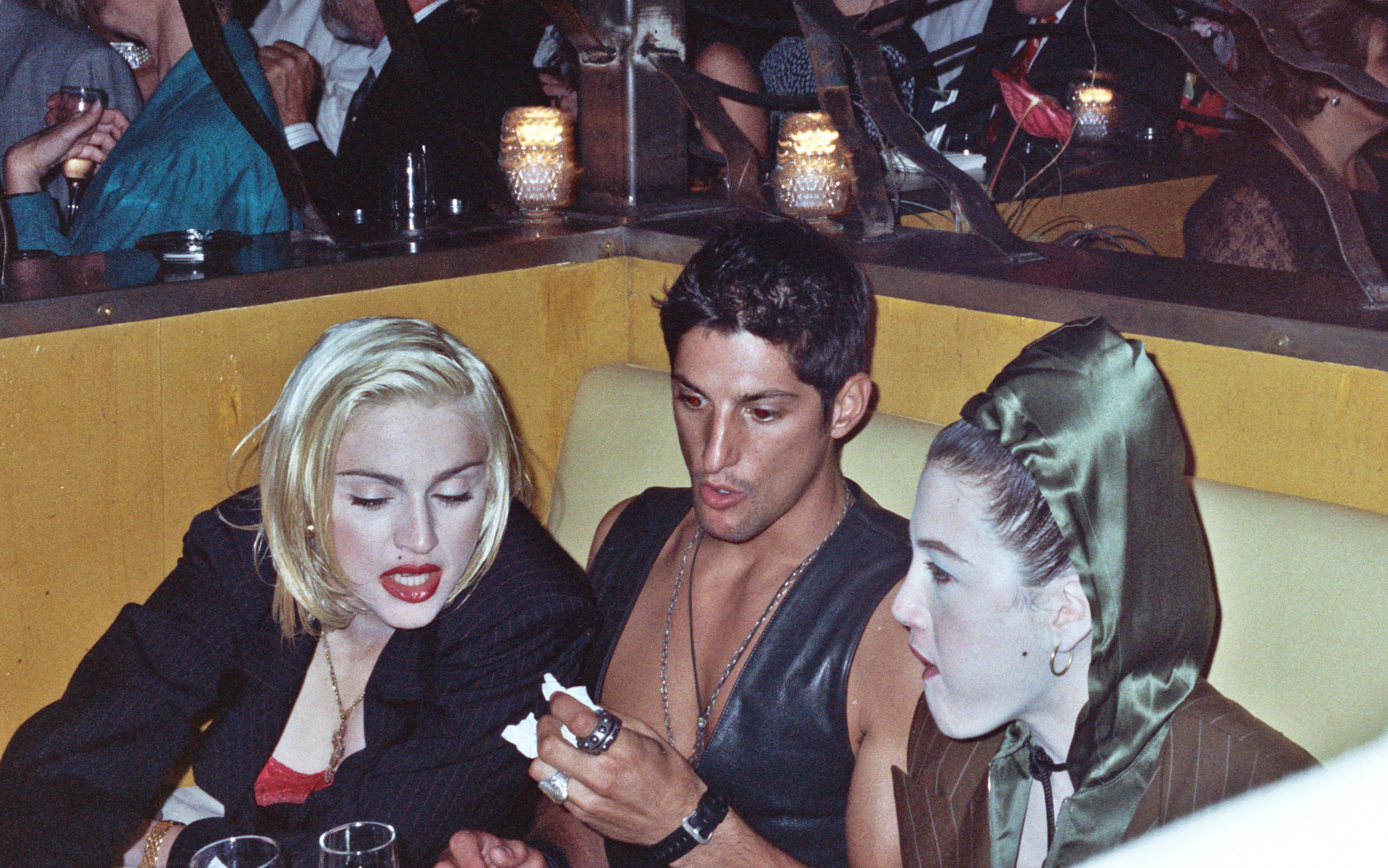
Pop singer Madonna engaged in a conversation with two companions.

No generally accepted definition of conversation exists, beyond the fact that a conversation involves at least two people talking together. Consequently, the term is often defined by what it is not. A ritualized exchange such as a mutual greeting is not a conversation, and an interaction that includes a marked status differential (such as a boss giving orders) is also not a conversation. An interaction with a tightly focused topic or purpose is also generally not considered a conversation. Summarizing these properties, one authority writes that "Conversation is the kind of speech that happens informally, symmetrically, and for the purposes of establishing and maintaining social ties."

From a less technical perspective, a writer on etiquette in the early 20th century defined conversation as the polite give and take of subjects thought of by people talking with each other for company.

Conversations follow rules of etiquette because conversations are social interactions, and therefore depend on social convention. Specific rules for conversation arise from the cooperative principle. Failure to adhere to these rules causes the conversation to deteriorate or eventually to end. Contributions to a conversation are responses to what has previously been said.

Conversations may be the optimal form of communication, depending on the participants' intended ends. Conversations may be ideal when, for example, each party desires a relatively equal exchange of information, or when the parties desire to build social ties. On the other hand, if permanency or the ability to review such information is important, written communication may be ideal. Or if time-efficient communication is most important, a speech may be preferable.

Conversation involves a lot more nuanced and implied context, that lies beneath just the words.

Conversation is generally face-to-face person-to-person at the same time (synchronous) – possibly online with video applications such as Skype, but might also include audio-only phone calls. It would not generally include internet written communication which tends to be asynchronous (not same time – can read and respond later if at all) and does not fit the 'con'='with' in 'conversation'. In face to face conversation it has been suggested that 85% of the communication is non-verbal/body language – a smile, a frown, a shrug, tone of voice conveying much added meaning to the mere words. Short forms of written communication such as sms are thus frequently misunderstood.

In English slang, a conversation that is generally found to be uninteresting is referred to as 'boring' and the person at the center of that conversation a 'bore'.

== Classification ==
=== Banter ===
Banter is short witty sentences that bounce back and forth between individuals. Often banter uses clever put-downs and witty insults similar to flyting, misunderstandings (often intentional), zippy wisecracks, zingers, flirtation, and puns. The idea is that each line of banter should "top" the one before it and be, in short, a verbal war of wit.

Films that have used banter as a way of structure in conversations are:

- Bringing Up Baby (1938)
- His Girl Friday (1940)
- The Big Sleep (1946)
- Much Ado About Nothing (1993)

Important factors in delivering a banter is the subtext, situation and the rapport with the person. Every line in a banter should be able to evoke both an emotional response and ownership without hurting one's feelings. Following a structure that the involved parties understand is important, even if the subject and structure is absurd, a certain level of progression should be kept in a manner that it connects with the involved parties.

Different methods of story telling could be used in delivering banter, like making an unexpected turn in the flow of structure (interrupting a comfortable structure), taking the conversation towards an expected crude form with evoking questions, doubts, self-conscientiousness (creating intentional misunderstandings), or layering the existing pattern with multiple anchors. It is important to quit the bantering with the sensibility of playground rules, both parties should not obsess on topping each other, continuously after a certain point of interest. It is as Shakespeare said "Brevity is the soul of wit."

=== Discussion ===
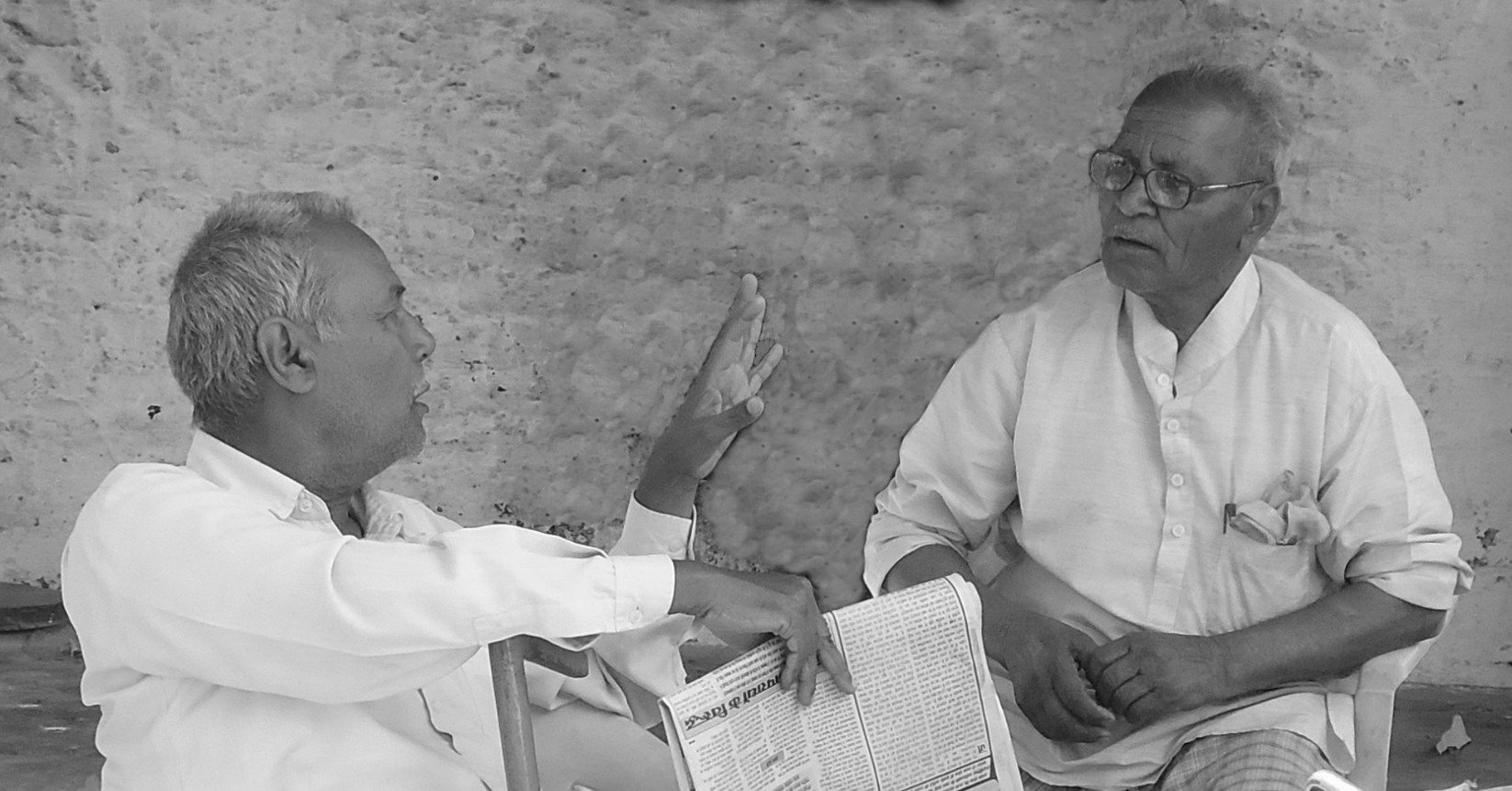
Discussion between two old friends

One element of conversation is discussion: sharing opinions on subjects that are thought of during the conversation. In polite society the subject changes before discussion becomes dispute or controversial. For example, if theology is being discussed, maybe no one is insisting a particular view be accepted.

=== Subject ===
Many conversations can be divided into four categories according to their major subject content:

- Subjective ideas, which often serve to extend understanding and awareness.
- Objective facts, which may serve to consolidate a widely held view.
- Other people (usually absent), which may be either critical, competitive, or supportive. This includes gossip.
- Oneself, which sometimes indicate attention-seeking behavior or can provide relevant information about oneself to participants in the conversation.

The proportional distribution of any given conversation between the categories can offer useful psychological insights into the mind set of the participants. Practically, however, few conversations fall exclusively into one category. This is the reason that the majority of conversations are difficult to categorize.

=== Functions ===
Most conversations may be classified by their goal. Conversational ends may shift over the life of the conversation.

- Functional conversation is designed to convey information in order to help achieve an individual or group goal.
- Small talk is a type of conversation where the topic is less important than the social purpose of achieving bonding between people or managing personal distance, such as 'how is the weather' might be portrayed as an example, which conveys no practicality whatsoever.

== Aspects ==
=== Differences between men and women ===
A study completed in July 2007 by Matthias Mehl of the University of Arizona shows that contrary to popular belief, there is little difference in the number of words used by men and women in conversation. The study showed that on average each gender uses about 16,000 words per day.

=== Between strangers ===
There are certain situations, typically encountered while traveling, which result in strangers sharing what would ordinarily be an intimate social space such as sitting together on a bus or airplane. In such situations strangers are likely to share intimate personal information they would not ordinarily share with strangers. A special case emerges when one of the travelers is a mental health professional and the other party shares details of their personal life in the apparent hope of receiving help or advice.

=== Narcissism ===
Conversational narcissism is a term used by the Marxist sociologist Charles Derber in his book The Pursuit of Attention: Power and Ego in Everyday Life.

Derber argued that the social support system in America is relatively weak, which leads people to compete for attention. In social situations, he believes that people tend to steer the conversation away from others and toward themselves. "Conversational narcissism is the key manifestation of the dominant attention-getting psychology in America," he wrote. "It occurs in informal conversations among friends, family and coworkers. The profusion of popular literature about listening and the etiquette of managing those who talk constantly about themselves suggests its pervasiveness in everyday life." Derber asserts that this "conversational narcissism" often occurs subtly rather than overtly because it is socially prudent to avoid being judged an egotist.

Derber distinguishes the "shift-response" from the "support-response". A "shift-response" takes the focus of attention away from the last speaker and refocuses on the new speaker, as in: "John: I'm feeling really starved. Mary: Oh, I just ate." Whereas, a "support-response" maintains the focus on the last speaker, as in: "John: I'm feeling really starved. Mary: When was the last time you ate?"

=== Artificial intelligence ===
The ability to generate conversation that cannot be distinguished from a human participant has been one test of a successful artificial intelligence (the Turing test). A human judge engages in a natural-language conversation with one human and one machine, during which the machine tries to appear human (and the human does not try to appear other than human). If the judge cannot tell the machine from the human, the machine is said to have passed the test. One limitation of this test is that the conversation is by text as opposed to speech, not allowing tone to be shown.

=== One's self ===
Also called intrapersonal communication, the act of conversing with oneself can help solve problems or serve therapeutic purposes like avoiding silence.

== Literature ==
Authors who have written extensively on conversation and attempted to analyze its nature include:

- Milton Wright wrote The Art of Conversation, a comprehensive treatment of the subject, in 1936. The book deals with conversation both for its own sake, and for political, sales, or religious ends. Milton portrays conversation as an art or creation that people can play with and give life to.
- Kerry Patterson, Joseph Grenny, Al Switzler, and Ron McMillan have written two New York Times bestselling books on conversation. The first one, Crucial Conversations: Tools for Talking When Stakes are High, McGraw-Hill, 2002, teaches skills for handling disagreement and high-stakes issues at work and at home. The second book, Crucial Accountability: Tools for Resolving Violated Expectations, Broken Commitments, and Bad Behavior, McGraw-Hill, 2013, teaches important skills for dealing with accountability issues.
- Difficult Conversations: How to Discuss What Matters Most (Viking Penguin, 1999), a book by Bruce Patton, Douglas Patterson and Sheila Heen was one of the work products from the Harvard Negotiation Project. This book built on, and extended the approach developed by Roger Fisher and William Ury in Getting To Yes: Negotiating Agreement Without Giving In (Houghton Mifflin, 1981). The book introduced useful concepts such as the Three Conversations (The 'What Happened' Conversation, The Feelings Conversation, and The Identity Conversation), Creating a Learning Conversation, and Collaborative Problem Solving.
- Charles Blattberg has written two books defending an approach to politics that emphasizes conversation, in contrast to negotiation, as the preferred means of resolving conflict. His From Pluralist to Patriotic Politics: Putting Practice First, Oxford and New York: Oxford University Press, 2000, ISBN 0-19-829688-6, is a work of political philosophy; and his Shall We Dance? A Patriotic Politics for Canada, Montreal and Kingston: McGill-Queen's University Press, 2003, ISBN 0-7735-2596-3, applies that philosophy to the Canadian case.
- Paul Drew & John Heritage – Talk at Work, a study of how conversation changes in social and workplace situations.
- Neil Postman – Amusing Ourselves to Death (Conversation is not the book's specific focus, but discourse in general gets good treatment here)
- Deborah Tannen
  - The Argument Culture: Stopping America's War of Words
  - Conversational Style: Analyzing Talk Among Friends
  - Gender and Discourse
  - I Only Say This Because I Love You
  - Talking from 9 to 5: Women and Men at Work
  - That's Not What I Meant!
  - You Just Don't Understand: Women and Men in Conversation
- Daniel Menaker – A Good Talk: The Story and Skill of Conversation (published 2010)

=== In fiction ===
- Conversation in The Cathedral (1969) is one of the main novels by the Peruvian writer Mario Vargas Llosa.

== See also ==
- A Complete Collection of Genteel and Ingenious Conversation (book)
- Aizuchi
- Awkward silence
- Bohm Dialogue
- Chatbot
- Compulsive talking
- Dialectic
- Conversation theory
- Conversational scoreboard
- "Conversation" Sharp MP – doyen of the Georgian period conversationalists
- Conversazione – a social gathering for conversation and discussion, especially about the arts, literature and science.
- Debate
- Dialogue
- Discourse
- King of Clubs – famous Whig conversation club
- Online chat
- Speech (public address)

== Works cited ==
- Thornbury, Scott; Slade, Diana (2006). Conversation: From Description to Pedagogy. Cambridge University Press. ISBN 978-0521814263.
- Warren, Martin (2006). Features of Naturalness in Conversation. John Benjamins. ISBN 978-9027253958.
