= French drop =

Sleight-of-hand magic trick

First move of the French drop.

The French drop, also known as "Le Tourniquet", is a sleight of hand method used by magicians to vanish a small object such as a coin or ball. It is one of the oldest methods of vanishing, however it is still effective when properly executed. Although the method is known as a vanish, it can also be used as a switch or transformation, giving rise to numerous possibilities.

== Method ==
The object is held between the thumb and first two finger tips. When using a coin, it is held by its edges and tilted up slightly so it can be seen by the spectators. The other hand appears to take the coin, placing the thumb behind the coin and the fingers in front, however the coin is left behind and palmed.
