= Men Are from Mars, Women Are from Venus =

1992 book by John Gray

- First edition
- Author: John Gray
- Language: English
- Genre: non-fiction, relationships, psychology, self-help
- Publisher: HarperCollins
- Publication date: 1992
- Publication place: United States
- Media type: Hardcover
- Pages: 286
- ISBN: 978-0060574215

Men Are from Mars, Women Are from Venus (1992) is a book written by American author and relationship counselor John Gray. The book states that most common relationship problems between men and women are a result of fundamental psychological differences between the sexes, which the author exemplifies by means of its eponymous metaphor: that men and women are from distinct planets—men from Mars and women from Venus—and that each sex is acclimated to its own planet's society and customs, but not to those of the other. One example is men's complaint that if they offer solutions to problems that women bring up in conversation, the women are not necessarily interested in solving those problems, but talking about them. The book asserts each sex can be understood in terms of distinct ways they respond to stress and stressful situations.

The book has sold more than 15 million copies and, according to a CNN report, it was the "highest ranked work of non-fiction" of the 1990s, spending 121 weeks on the bestseller list. The book and its central metaphor have become a part of popular culture and the foundation for the author's subsequent books, recordings, seminars, and other ventures.

== Results ==
Gray writes how men and women each monitor the amount of give and take in relationships. If the balance shifts, one person feeling they have given more than they have received, resentment can develop. This is a time when only communication can help to bring the relationship back into balance.

Gray further asserts men and women view giving and receiving love differently; one's intended loving expressions may not be so perceived by the other, for whom such actions are "tallied up". According to Gray, women and men are often surprised to find their partners "keep score" at all, or that their scoring methods widely differ.

He says women use a points system which few men are aware of. Each individual act of love gets one point, regardless of magnitude. Men, on the other hand, assign small acts, small expenditures, fewer points. Larger blocks of points (20, 30, 40 points, etc.) go to what they consider bigger expenditures. To a woman, the emotional stroke delivered by sincere attention is inseparable from the act. The different perception of expenditure can lead to conflict when the man thinks his work has earned him, say, 20 points and deserves corresponding recognition, while the woman has assigned him only 1 point and recognizes him accordingly. The man tends to think he can do one Big Thing for her (scoring 50 points) and not do much else, assuming he has "banked" points and can afford to "coast". The woman should be satisfied with his performance and give him credit for it. Instead, the woman would rather have many little things done for her on a regular basis, because women like to think their men are thinking of them and care for them more constantly. Gray clarifies how these two perceptions of "strokes" cause conflict. He encourages talking about these issues openly.

Another major idea put forth in Gray's book regards the difference in the way the genders react to stress. Gray states that when male tolerance to stressful situations is exceeded, they withdraw temporarily, "retreating into their cave", so to speak. Often, they literally retreat: for example, to the garage, or to go spend time with friends. In their "caves", Gray writes, men are not necessarily focused on the problem at hand. Yet this "time-out" lets them distance themselves from the problem and relax, allowing them to re-examine the problem later from a fresh perspective.

Gray holds that male retreat into the cave has historically been hard for women to understand. When women become unduly stressed, their natural reaction is to talk with someone close about it (even if talking doesn't provide a solution to the problem at hand). This sets up a natural dynamic where the man retreats as the woman tries to get closer, which becomes a major source of conflict between them.

The "wave" is a term Gray uses to describe a natural dynamic centered around a woman's ability to give to other people. He writes when she feels full of love and energy to give to others, her wave is stable. When she gives of herself, but doesn't receive adequate love and attention in return, her wave becomes unbalanced, cresting and eventually crashing. Then, a woman needs the attention, listening, understanding, and reassurance of those around her—as well as self-love. Gray explains that once she is rejuvenated by getting the support she needs, her wave is able to build and rise once again, with renewed love and energy to give. Men, advises Gray, should support this natural cycle by not being threatened by it or telling her why she should not feel the way a woman feels.

== Reception ==
=== Popularity ===
The book has sold more than 15 million copies and, according to a CNN report, it was the "highest ranked work of non-fiction" of the 1990s.

The book has become a "popular paradigm" for problems in relationships based on the different tendencies in each gender and has spawned infomercials, audiotapes and videotapes, weekend seminars, theme vacations, a one-man Broadway show, a TV sitcom, and a proposed movie topic with 20th Century Fox. The book has been turned into a successful stage show in France in 2006, where it has been running for six years in Paris. In 2012, an English version went on tour in the UK.

=== Criticism ===
The book has been criticized for placing human psychology into stereotypes.

Michael Kimmel, a professor of sociology at Stony Brook University, makes the assertion that men and women are not fundamentally different, contrary to what Gray suggests in his book. In Kimmel's 2008 lecture at Middlebury College in Vermont, titled "Venus, Mars, or Planet Earth? Women and Men in a New Millennium", Kimmel contends that the perceived differences between men and women are ultimately a social construction, and that socially and politically, men and women want the same things.

In 2002, author Julia T. Wood published a critical response to the portrayal of the genders in Men Are from Mars, Women Are from Venus. In the first chapter of the 2003 book, The Essential Difference, Simon Baron-Cohen states: "the view that men are from Mars and women Venus paints the differences between the two sexes as too extreme. The two sexes are different, but are not so different that we cannot understand each other." In 2004, Erina MacGeorge, a Purdue University communications professor, said that based on research she conducted using questionnaires and interviews, men and women are not so different and "books like John Gray's Men Are from Mars, Women Are from Venus and Deborah Tannen's You Just Don't Understand tell men that being masculine means dismissing feelings and downplaying problems (which many men themselves that read the book disagree with). That isn't what most men do, and it isn't good for either men or women." (Tannen, a famous sociolinguist, did not personally agree with Gray's perspective that male and female language are innately different, herself writing The Myth of Mars and Venus in 1992 in opposition to it.)

A study by Bobbi Carothers and Harry Reis involving over 13,000 individuals, titled, "Men and Women Are from Earth..." found that on most psychological characteristics or tendencies, including the Big Five personality traits as well as sex-related questions like rating level of desire for casual sex, there was not a taxonomic difference between men and women on the vast majority of personality traits and preferences. Despite there being differences in averages by gender, the distributions overlapped so much that a taxonomic distinction was not meaningful. "Thus, contrary to the assertions of pop psychology titles like Men Are from Mars, Women Are from Venus, it is untrue that men and women think about their relationships in qualitatively different ways." There were notable taxonomic differences on physical attributes and measurements of physical strength.

== See also ==
- Gender essentialism
- Gender polarization
- Relationship counseling
- Sex and psychology
- The Myth Of Mars And Venus: Do Men and Women Really Speak Different Languages?
