= Al Schneider (magician) =

- Born: Alvin Duane Schneider; February 3, 1943 (age 82); Detroit, Michigan
- Years active: 1960–present
- Known for: Magician

Alvin Duane Schneider (born February 3, 1943) is an American magician, author, physicist and mathematician known for his contributions to magic. He developed the Matrix magic trick, a modern version of Yank Hoe's "Sympathetic Coins".

== Biography ==
Schneider was born and raised in Detroit, Michigan. He lived in Minneapolis, Minnesota, for most of his life and spent a year in Denver, Colorado. He started in magic in 1960 during his senior year in high school. In 1967, Schneider graduated from Wayne State University with a degree in physics after seven years of part-time schooling. During his free time, he studied magic, working toward his goal of a career in professional magic.

In 1960, Schneider developed the Matrix magic trick, where four cards are placed over four coins, and the coins then invisibly move between cards. Matrix is a modernized version of Yank Hoe's "Sympathetic Coins." Countless magicians have since developed variations and improvements upon the effect, cementing Schneider's legacy in the annals of coin conjuring.

In 1969, Schneider left his job as a mathematician for Uniroyal and accepted a position as a systems analyst for Univac, specializing in computers. Univac transferred him to Minneapolis, Minnesota, where he worked as a systems programmer.

In 1972, he began writing and publishing magic books after the computer industry suffered a downturn. He worked as an editor of the house organ Goldshadow Newsletter and also as a dealer for Goldshadow Industries. Schneider theorized that "misdirection, while essential for effective magic, is actually a supporting technique for the greater concept of hiding the spectators' false assumptions."

Since early 2001, he has operated a web page sharing magic information titled World Magic Center.

Schneider was also interested in full-contact karate, sword fighting, golf, skiing, theoretical physics, and quantum mechanics. Schneider gave magic lessons to Suzanne the Magician, who tricked Penn and Teller on Penn & Teller: Fool Us with a magic routine called "A Mother's Love."

== Books ==
- Matrix (1974)
- Off (1974)
- Al Schneider on Coins (1975)
- Al Schneider on Close-Up (1980)
- Al Schneider on Zombie (1981)
- Al Schneider Magic (2011)
- New Age Quantum Physics (2012)
- Quantum Mechanics A-Z without the BS (2013)
