= Harry Reis =

American psychologist (born in 1949)

Harry T. Reis (born 1949) is a professor of psychology at the University of Rochester. He has been a leading figure in the field of social psychology, credited with helping to launch the study of relationship science and notable for his contribution to theories of intimacy. His research encompasses emotional regulation, the factors that influence social interaction, and consequences of different socializing patterns for health and psychological well-being.

== Career ==
Reis received a B.S. from City College of New York in 1970 and a Ph.D. from New York University in 1975. He has served as president of the International Society for the Study of Personal Relationships and chair of the American Psychological Association's Board of Scientific Affairs, as well as executive officer and later, president of the Society for Personality and Social Psychology. In 2012, Reis was selected for the Distinguished Career Award from the International Association for Relationship Research. He was also the recipient of the 2009 Goergen Award for Distinguished Achievement and Artistry in Undergraduate Teaching. Among his other accomplishments, Reis was an editor for the Journal of Personality and Social Psychology (Interpersonal Relations and Group Processes) and later Current Directions in Psychological Science.

In particular, Reis investigates psychological processes that affect interpersonal relationships, intimacy, and attachment. His studies address gender and sex factors, dating variables, perspectives on partner responsiveness, principles of familiarity, and perceptions of similarity and dissimilarity. Much of his research is informed by his subjects’ detailed, daily records of social activity. His research has been funded by the National Science Foundation, the National Institute of Mental Health, the National Heart, Lung and Blood Institute, Israel Science Foundation, and the Fetzer Institute. He was a Fulbright Senior Research Scholar in 1991.

== Selected works ==
- Carothers, B.J.; Reis, H.T. (2012). "Men and Women Are From Earth: Examining the latent structure of Gender.". Journal of Personality and Social Psychology. 104 (2). Advance online application: Journal of Personality and Social Psychology.: 385–407. doi:10.1037/a0030437. PMID 23088230.
- Finkel, E.J., Eastwick, P.W., Karney, B.R., Reis, H.T., & Sprecher, S. (2012). Online dating: A critical analysis from the perspective of psychological science. Psychological Science in the Public Interest, 13, 3–66.
- Vangelisti, A. L., Reis, H. T., & Fitzpatrick, M. A. (Eds.). (2011). Stability and change in relationships. New York: Cambridge University Press.
- Reis, H.T., Maniaci, M.R., Caprariello, P.A., Eastwick, P.W., & Finkel, E.J. (2011). Familiarity does indeed promote attraction in live interaction. Journal of Personality and Social Psychology, 101, 557–570.
- Reis, H.T., Smith, S.M., Carmichael, C.L., Caprariello, P.A., Tsai, F.F., Rodrigues, A., & Maniaci, M.R. (2010). Are you happy for me? How sharing positive events with others provides personal and interpersonal benefits. Journal of Personality and Social Psychology, 99, 311–329.
- Reis, H.T. (2007). Steps toward the ripening of relationship science. Personal Relationships, 14, 1–23.
- Reis, H.T., Collins, W.A., & Berscheid, E. (2000). The relationship context of human behavior and development. Psychological Bulletin, 126, 844–872.
- Editor of Reis, H. T., & Judd, C. M. (Eds.) (2014). Handbook of research methods in social and personality psychology (2nd ed.). New York: Cambridge University Press.
- Reis, H. T. & Shaver, P. (1988). Intimacy as an interpersonal process. In S. Duck (Ed.), Handbook of personal relationships (pp. 367–389). Chichester: John Wiley and Sons, Ltd.
- Clark, M. S., & Reis, H. T. (1988). Interpersonal processes in close relationships. Annual Review of Psychology, 39, 609–672.
- Reis, H. T., Wheeler, L., Spiegel, N., Kernis, M., Nezlek, J., & Perri, M. (1982). Physical attractiveness in social interaction, II: Why does appearance affect social experience? Journal of Personality and Social Psychology, 43, 979–996.
- Gable, S. L., Reis, H. T., Impett, E. A., & Asher, E. R. (2004). What do you do when things go right?: The intrapersonal and interpersonal benefits of sharing positive events. Journal of Personality and Social Psychology, 87, 228–245.
- Reis, H. T., & Patrick, B. C. (1996). Attachment and intimacy: Component processes. In A. Kruglanski & E. T. Higgins (Eds.), Social psychology: Handbook of basic principles (pp. 523–563). New York: Guilford.
- Reis, H. T., & Wheeler, L. (1991). Studying social interaction with the Rochester Interaction Record. Advances in Experimental Social Psychology (Vol. 24, pp. 269–318). San Diego, CA: Academic Press.
- Berscheid, E., & Reis, H. T. (1998). Attraction and close relationships. In D. Gilbert, S. Fiske, & G. Lindzey, (Eds.), Handbook of social psychology (4th ed.) (pp. 193–281). New York: Oxford University Press.
- Reis, H. T. (2008). Reinvigorating the concept of situation in social psychology. Personality and Social Psychology Review, 12, 311–329.
- Reis, H. T., & Gosling, S. D. (2010). Social psychological methods outside the laboratory. In S. Fiske, D. Gilbert, & G. Lindzey, (Eds.), Handbook of social psychology (5th ed., vol. 1, pp. 82–114). New York: Wiley.
- Reis, H. T. (2012). A brief history of relationship research in social psychology. In A. W. Kruglanski & W. Stroebe (Eds.), Handbook of the history of social psychology (pp. 363–382). New York: Psychology Press.
- King, K. B., & Reis, H. T. (2012). Marriage and long-term survival after coronary artery bypass grafting. Health Psychology, 31, 55–62.
- Reis, H. T., & Carothers, B. J. (2014). Black and white or shades of gray: Are gender differences categorical or dimensional? Current Directions in Psychological Science, 23, 19–26.

== See also ==
- Men Are from Mars, Women Are from Venus
