= Ryan Hayashi =

Canadian magician

- Born: Ryan Lam; May 28, 1973 (age 53); Dunnville, Canada
- Education: Carleton University
- Years active: 2000–present
- Website: ryanhayashi.com

Ryan Lam (born May 28, 1973) known professionally as Ryan Hayashi, is a Canadian magician, mentalist and performer. Hayashi focuses on coin magic and is known for his coin matrix. He also works in other forms of magic including cards, mentalism and displays of skill such as blindfolded performances with a samurai sword. Hayashi has performed magic in 18 different countries. He is a self-described "samurai entertainer" and has performed on multiple talent contests including Germany's Got Talent, Britain's Got Talent and Czechoslovakia's Got Talent.

== Career ==
Hayashi began pursuing magic at the age of eight and began training in martial arts when he was nine. After high school, he studied French and linguistics at Carleton University in Ottawa in 1992. He began training in traditional Shotokan and worked as an English lecturer in Tokyo. In 2000, he moved to Mannheim, Germany where he made a name for himself as a magician. There, since at least as far back as July 30th, 2008, he has owned and currently operates The Hayashi Dojo Karateschule.

Hayashi took part in his first magic championship in 2001. His second championship was the Deutsche Meisterschaften Der Zauberkunst where he placed 4th which was not enough to qualify for the FISM World Championships. From 2003 to 2005 he participated in 16 competitions worldwide, including the SAM European Championships of Magic. Hayashi won the MacMillan International Magic Competition in 2003 and gained the unofficial title "European Champion of Magic" in 2005.

He won first place in card magic during the 2005 German Championships and second place in micromagic qualifying him for the 2006 FISM World Championships in Stockholm. In 2007, Hayashi won the audience award at the IBM Gold Cups National Championships in the United States. He has made various appearances at the Magic Circle in London, the Wizard's Inn in Tokyo, the 4F Convention in Batavia, New York, the British IBM in Eastbourne and the Magic Castle in Hollywood.

In 2018, Hayashi appeared on the 5th season of Penn & Teller: Fool Us where he successfully fooled Penn and Teller with his over-the-top coin matrix performance. Hayashi's performance has been listed by Geek.com as one of the "11 Best Tricks From 'Penn & Teller: Fool Us'". He appeared again on the show's seventh season in April 2021, teaming up with his son Gianluca Maniaci (stage name "Johnny Hayashi").

In November and December 2019, Hayashi worked with the charity, "Help for Heroes", where he performed with magicians Edward Askham-Spencer, Etienne Pradier, Ole Gold and Steel Johnson.

== See also ==
- Card magic
- Coin magic
- Penn & Teller: Fool Us
