= David Roth (magician) =

American magician (1952–2021)

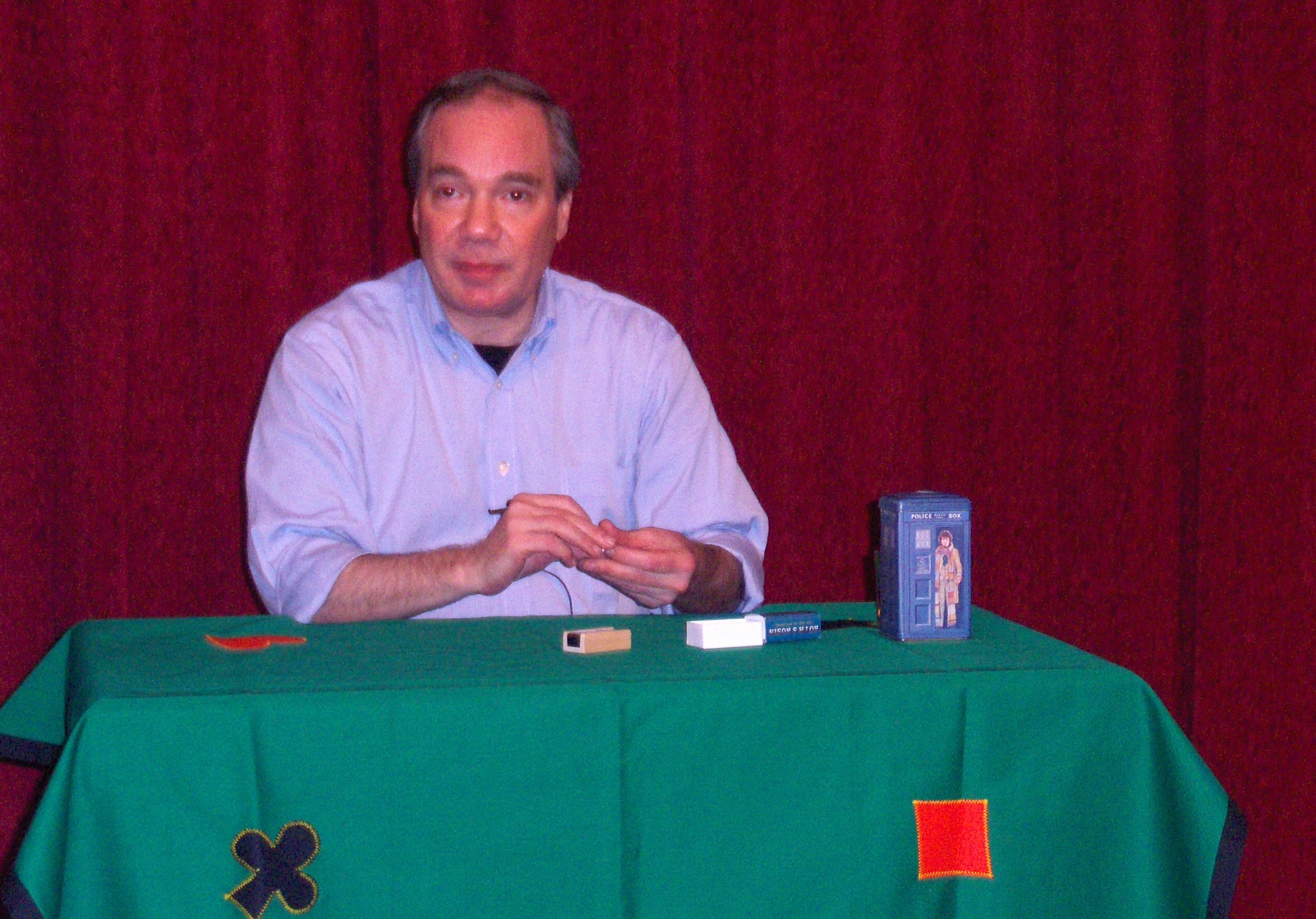
- Born: March 13, 1952; New York City
- Died: January 15, 2021 (aged 68)
- Occupation(s): Magician, Lecturer
- Website: http://www.davidrothmagic.com/

David Roth (March 13, 1952 – January 13, 2021) was an American magician widely regarded as one of the world's greatest coin magicians. Roth was an important contributor to Richard Kaufman's Coinmagic, an influential text on contemporary coin technique; his major work was chronicled in David Roth's Expert Coin Magic, a book written by Richard Kaufman. Roth was associated with Fantasma Magic, a magic manufacturing and retail company in New York City before going to work for the Conjuring Arts Research Center during the last decade of his life.

The sleight of hand artist Dai Vernon wrote about Roth:

"First let me state that David Roth has an amazing ability when performing with coins. He is truly a genius. I have been fortunate to have enjoyed the confidence and friendship of the leading exponents of coin manipulation of the past. T. Nelson Downs, Allan Shaw, Manuel and Welch Miller all specialized in this branch of the magical art. To the very best of my judgment, David’s ideas and execution far surpass any one of them. I feel quite certain that if they could witness his performance they would not only be astounded but realize that they had seen the master."

== Major technical contributions ==
Dai Vernon is reported to have called Roth the greatest coin magician he has seen. According to Jamy Ian Swiss, Roth "changed coin magic for all time". Roth's trick "The Hanging Coins" (which was first revealed in Apocalypse magazine, Volume 1, No. 6, page 68, 1978) took an ancient, and long ignored, sleight-of-hand technique and made it far more deceptive and useful. This technique, which Roth dubbed "Edge Grip", has subsequently been explored in depth by other experts in the field. It is a significant tool of contemporary coin magic.

Roth's virtuoso execution of a "persistence of vision vanish" led to tremendous interest in his handling of the move (which he referred to as "The Retention Vanish"), and – perhaps – to increased use of this move among magicians.

Roth's handling and application of a technique that has – largely thanks to him – become known as "The Shuttle Pass" is highly influential.

Roth's "The Original Chinese Coin Assembly" was highly influential as the first published coin assembly that used the bare hands. This was a highly influential development that has been widely used and explored by other sleight-of-hand experts.

== Magic Castle awards ==
- 1974 "Visiting Magician of the Year"
- 1977 "Close Up Magician of the Year"
- 1998 "Creative Fellowship Award"
- 1999 The "Medal of the Inner Magic Circle with the Gold Star"
- 1999 "Lecturer of the Year"

== Works ==
=== Books ===
- Expert Coin Magic. New York: R. Kaufman and A. Greenberg. 1985.

=== Videos ===
- Ultimate Coin Magic Collection (DVD-Video). Tahoma: L & L Publishing. 2002. OCLC 459793899.
  - Volume 1: Magic with Copper/Silver Coins & Expanded Shells / Magic with Folding Coins & Specialty Gaffs
  - Volume 2: Magic with Coins & Silks / Magic with the Okito Coin Box
  - Volume 3: Classic Showpieces / Live in Sacramento
  - Volume 4: Dinnertable Coin Magic / Coin Flourishes, Stunts & Wagers
- David Roth's Expert Coin Magic Made Easy (DVD-Video). Tahoma: L & L Publishing. 2008. OCLC 427386624.
  - Volume 1: Basic Coin Magic
  - Volume 2: Basic to Intermediate Coin Magic
  - Volume 3: Intermediate to Advanced Coin Magic

=== DVD ===
New York Coin Magic Seminar DVD series volumes 1-16 (2004-2011)

== Theatrical credits ==
In 2003, Roth co-wrote and co-starred along with Darwin Ortiz in All of the People, All of the Time. It also co-starred actress Ruth Williamson and was co-written by Patrick Cook. It opened in Charlotte, North Carolina, and later played in Waterford, Connecticut.

Roth has consulted for Ricky Jay's production of On The Stem as well as Ricky Jay and His 52 Assistants in which he was credited in the program as Ricky's '53rd Assistant'.
