= Doug Henning's World of Magic =

- Also known as: World of Magic
- Genre: Entertainment
- Created by: Doug Henning
- Starring: Doug Henning
- Country of origin: United States
- Original language: English

Production
- Producer: David Susskind
- Production company: Doug Henning Magic Inc.

Original release
- Network: NBC
- Release: December 26, 1975

Doug Henning's World of Magic is a series of seven annual prime-time television specials starring magician Doug Henning that aired from 1975 to 1982.

The first special aired live on NBC Friday, December 26, 1975. Bill Cosby was the show's special guest, along with Gene Kelly (who introduced the special) and musical guest Lori Lieberman. The show ran live without commercials under the sponsorship of Mobil.

The first effect showed a close up on Doug's hands manipulating a nickel, then a jukebox production of Cosby. He introduced a number of novel (for the time) illusions, including a version of Buatier De Kolta's Vanishing Lady illusion (featuring Lieberman) and concluded with an up-tempo version of Houdini's Chinese Water Torture Cell.

The special was the top-rated show for the evening, with a reported 50 million viewers, making it the highest-rated magic special of all time. The show also won the Christopher Award for outstanding achievement. In 1977, the show won an Emmy for Outstanding Achievement in Technical Direction and Electronic Camerawork.

The 1982 special featured Caitlyn Jenner, Billy Crystal and Ann Jillian with Cherish Alexander as Doug Henning’s co-host.
