= Doug Henning =

Canadian illusionist (1947–2000)

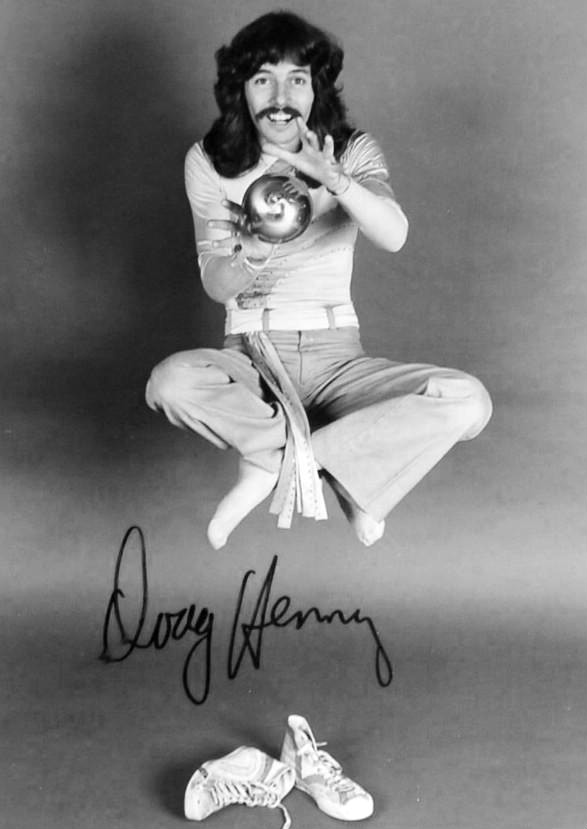
- Henning in 1976
- Born: Douglas James Henning; May 3, 1947; Winnipeg, Manitoba, Canada
- Died: February 7, 2000 (aged 52); Los Angeles, California, U.S.
- Occupations: Magician, illusionist, escape artist, politician
- Spouses: Barbara De Angelis (m. 1977; div. 1981) Debby Douillard (m. 1981)

Douglas James Henning (May 3, 1947 – February 7, 2000) was a Canadian magician, illusionist, escape artist and politician.

== Early life ==
Henning was born in the Fort Garry district of Winnipeg, Manitoba.

Henning became interested in magic after seeing the Peruvian magician Richiardi Jr. perform on The Ed Sullivan Show. He subsequently learned a variety of tricks and performed for his relatives. He began practising magic at Oakenwald School in Fort Garry. Later, his family relocated to Oakville, Ontario. Eventually he named himself "The Astounding Hendoo" and started advertising in local newspapers.

After Henning graduated from Oakville Trafalgar High School, he stopped doing magic, not wanting to do it for a living. He felt that there were only two kinds of magicians, "...magicians for kids, and magicians for nightclub acts. I didn't want to be either kind." So, instead, he enrolled and became a student at McMaster University in Hamilton, Ontario, and studied psychology, in preparation for a medical degree. There, Henning met Ivan Reitman, when he appeared in the 1968 Reitman-directed production of Li'l Abner in the role of Lonesome Polecat.

To support himself during this time, Henning worked at the Toronto International Airport, loading and unloading crates. He found the work to be too heavy and tiring; so, with the help of his partner Mars Barrick, he formed the partnership of Henning and Mars, and they performed at local bars and nightclubs.

On May 19, 1967, Doug's father, an Air Canada pilot, was killed during a training flight when his DC-8-54 crashed near the Ottawa International Airport.

== Career ==
Henning and Mars successfully performed with the top entertainers in Canada and travelled from one end of the country to the other.

Henning realized that he needed more theatrical training as well as in the principles of magic. He applied for a grant from the Canada Council for the Arts in the theatre division with a proposal that used the equation that magic plus theatre equals art. Henning was awarded a Canada Council for the Arts grant for $4,000. After being awarded the grant to study the art of magic for a year, he studied mime under Adrian Pecknold as well as dance with a Canadian choreographer. He sifted through magic literature in the hopes of developing an all-around magic education in manipulation and illusionism.

He visited the Magic Castle in Hollywood, California, a private club for magicians. After an impromptu performance in the Wine Cellar, he met resident magician, guru, and fellow Canadian Dai Vernon, known as the Professor. Since the terms of the grant required Henning to study magic, he got up the nerve later in the year to write the Professor and asked him if he could take lessons with him. Thereafter, Henning travelled to Hollywood to study with Vernon and then with another magic great, Slydini, whom he came to consider his primary teacher of magic.

Intending to return magic to its "glory days", Henning worked to perfect his craft. Garnering financial support, he developed a live theatrical show, Spellbound, written by David Cronenberg and directed by Henning's college friend Ivan Reitman. Along with music by Howard Shore and co-starring actress Jennifer Dale, Henning created a musical that combined his magic with a dramatic storyline.

Henning borrowed money for the project and spent $5,000 to build and design illusions. They set up a backer's audition in Toronto. One man found potential in the project and invested $70,000. It took so long to work out a plot around his illusions that there was time only for two dress rehearsals, neither of which was in the theatre.

The show opened at the Royal Alexandra Theatre in Toronto, where it broke box-office records. Henning reworked the show after catching the attention of New York producers and took it to Broadway as The Magic Show, with songs composed by Stephen Schwartz. Debuting in 1974, the show ran for four and a half years and earned Henning a Tony Award nomination.

Following his Broadway success, Henning approached NBC with the idea of producing a television special. It was not until Henning suggested that he would reproduce live Harry Houdini's famous and dangerous water-torture escape—for the first time since Houdini performed it himself—that the NBC executives signed him.

Henning spent the next eight months reworking his stage act for TV and practising the water-torture escape act. More than 50 million viewers tuned in for the December 1975 broadcast of Doug Henning's World of Magic, hosted by Bill Cosby.

In 1977, Henning co-wrote a biography of Houdini, Houdini: His Legend and His Magic. He created illusions for an Earth, Wind and Fire tour in 1979, and for two of singer Michael Jackson's concerts, including his 1984 Victory Tour.

In 1983, Henning was the producer and star of the Broadway musical Merlin. In 1984, he began a solo Broadway show, Doug Henning and His World of Magic.

In 1985, Doug & Debby Henning's Wonder Whims, a set of plush toys, were made by Panosh Place and copyrighted by Marvin Glass and Associates. There were a total of six Wonder Whim characters. Each came with an animal friend, a personalized story, and a magic kaleidoscope wand of colors and patterns.

=== The World of Magic specials ===
Henning's first World of Magic special aired on NBC on December 26, 1975. Henning successfully performed the water torture illusion, although he did not break Houdini's time record. Produced by famed talk show host David Susskind and sponsored by Mobil, the show ran live in the eastern United States without commercials. The event was the first of seven annual broadcasts, which eventually brought Henning seven Emmy Award nominations, including two back-to-back in 1976 and 1977 for World of Magic.

In December 1976, Doug Henning's World of Magic II aired, again live and with only two commercial breaks, on NBC. The theme for this show was "Fire, Water and Air" and it was hosted by actor Michael Landon, with guest star Joey Heatherton. The show included Henning vanishing an elephant. A segment of the show featured special guest magician Ricky Jay.

On December 15, 1977, Doug Henning's World of Magic III aired live with guests Glen Campbell and Sandy Duncan; the hyped illusion was "Walking Through a Brick Wall".

On December 14, 1978, Doug Henning's World of Magic IV aired with the theme "A Magical Journey Through Time"; however, due to numerous problems that occurred during the telecast, this was the last special broadcast live.

On February 15, 1979, there was a broadcast of the fifth World of Magic special, which was taped at the Las Vegas Hilton.

Doug Henning's World of Magic VI, taped at Osmond Studios in Orem, Utah, was broadcast February 22, 1980, on NBC. Bill Cosby made his second appearance as special guest. Marie Osmond also appeared on the program. Several revamped versions of illusions from earlier specials appeared. The finale was an escape and reappearance featuring a huge Rube Goldberg machine.

Henning's last TV special was World of Magic VII in 1982, which featured guest Caitlyn Jenner and several revamped versions of illusions from earlier specials. The theme was Henning's magical house, with rooms featuring magic from the past, present and future. In the show's finale, Henning created the illusion of turning a black horse and a white horse into a zebra.

At the end of each World of Magic performance, Henning addressed the audience with the same monologue: "Anything the mind can conceive is possible. Nothing is impossible. All you have to do is look within, and you can realize your fondest dreams. I would like to wish each one of you all of life's wonders and a joyful age of enlightenment."

=== Other television appearances ===
On May 20, 1974, Henning appeared as a guest on the game show To Tell the Truth. He received two of the four votes and then performed The Metamorphosis trick.

On December 13, 1977, Henning appeared as a guest on The Tonight Show Starring Johnny Carson. While Henning performed illusions and chatted with host Johnny Carson and his other guests, he also plugged his new book on Houdini and announced his impending marriage to Barbara De Angelis.

In 1979, Henning appeared on The Crystal Gayle Special, a variety program starring singer Crystal Gayle and featuring, along with Henning, B.B. King and the Statler Brothers. In 1980, Henning appeared on The Muppet Show, where he performed several tricks. He demonstrated chink-a-chink for Scooter, did a flying handkerchief trick for Kermit the Frog's nephew Robin, segmented a Muppet monster into four pieces (and put him together wrong), and performed The Metamorphosis. In December, Henning appeared on The Osmond Family Christmas Special, starring the popular brother/sister act Donny and Marie Osmond, as a guest with such entertainers as Peggy Fleming and Greg Evigan, at the time star of NBC's B. J. and the Bear.

On February 13, 1981, Henning made his seventh appearance on The Tonight Show Starring Johnny Carson. This show marked the first time that Henning was Carson's first guest.

A version of The Magic Show was mounted in Toronto at the Queen Elizabeth Theatre. The purpose of this show was to film in front of a live audience of several thousand people for broadcast on CBC Television. Henning came back to the show that had made him a star, and many changes were made for this new production. Most of the cast was changed, including the role of Cal, now performed by Didi Conn. Some script changes were made (the night club was now known as "Chez Manny" and the older, drunk magician was now named "Van Zyskin"). Some of the songs in the Broadway version were also changed (such as the risqué lyrics of Charmin's lament), or replaced totally, such as the song "Solid Silver Platform Shoes" (the once popular shoe style, by then out of fashion), which was replaced with "It's Gonna Take a Magician". The film version of the production was only aired once on Canadian television, but released on DVD decades later.

Henning was featured in television commercials during 1984 to promote the Plymouth Voyager minivan.

=== Retirement ===
In the mid-1980s, Henning quit his profession, sold his props, and moved to India in order to devote his time to Transcendental Meditation.

In 1993, he released a video for the Natural Law Party of Canada, made up of excerpts from his World of Magic specials along with newly recorded linking dialogue detailing his philosophy of how the world's problems could be solved by meditation and yogic flying.

== Transcendental Meditation ==
Henning had an increasing interest in Transcendental Meditation. He received a Ph.D. in the Science of Creative Intelligence from the Maharishi University in Switzerland.

In 1992, Henning and Transcendental Meditation founder Maharishi Mahesh Yogi drafted plans for a $1.5 billion project, Maharishi Veda Land, near Niagara Falls, Ontario, that would "combine astonishing, unique visual and sensory effects, state-of-the-art 3D imagery, and ultra high-tech entertainment technology with his best original magic illusion secrets". Attractions were to include a building suspended above water and a journey into the heart of a rose, but at the time of Henning's death the project's status was uncertain.

== Political career ==
In 1992, Henning was a Natural Law Party candidate in the United Kingdom's general election, contesting the Parliamentary constituency of Blackpool South in Lancashire. As a Canadian citizen, Henning qualified as a candidate under British electoral law, which allows candidates from Commonwealth nations. He finished fourth of four candidates, polling 173 votes. He was senior vice president of the Natural Law Party of Canada ("NLPC"), and ran as the party's candidate for the former Toronto riding of Rosedale in the 1993 federal election, finishing sixth out of ten candidates.

General Election 1992: Blackpool South
Party	Candidate	Votes	%	±%
Conservative	Nick Hawkins	19,880	45.2	−2.8
Labour	Gordon Marsden	18,213	41.5	+9.4
Liberal Democrats	Robert E. Wynne	5,673	12.9	−7.0
Natural Law	Douglas Henning	173	0.4	N/A
Majority		1,667	3.8	−12.2
Turnout		43,939	77.3	+3.9
Conservative hold		Swing	−6.1	

1993 Canadian federal election: Rosedale
Party	Candidate	Votes	%	±%
Liberal	Bill Graham	25,726	50.00	+8.78
Progressive Conservative	David MacDonald	10,930	21.24	-20.12
Reform	Daniel Jovkovic	6,413	12.46	
New Democratic	Jack Layton	5,547	10.78	-4.28
National	Martin Lanigan	1,091	2.12	
Natural Law	Doug Henning	817	1.59	
Green	Leslie Hunter	483	0.94	+0.22
Independent	Linda Dale Gibbons	350	0.68	
Marxist–Leninist	Steve Rutchinski	57	0.11	
Abolitionist	Yann Patrice D'Audibert Garcien	40	0.08	
Total valid votes		51,454	100.00	

== Personal life ==
Henning married Barbara De Angelis in 1977. Their marriage ended in divorce in 1981, and Henning married Debby Douillard in the Ladies' Dome in Fairfield, Iowa, in December of that year.

== Death and legacy ==
Henning died at the age of 52 on February 7, 2000, at Cedars Sinai Medical Center in Los Angeles, five months after being diagnosed with liver cancer. His ashes were scattered in the Pacific Ocean off Redondo Beach, California.

In 2005, a handwritten letter from Henning to James Randi was placed for auction on eBay, unbeknownst to Randi. When Randi learned of it, he announced on his blog that the letter had been "stolen" from his files. A week later, Randi wrote that he "managed to have the sale stopped" and that the letter was back in his possession, but did not elaborate on further details of the controversy. Randi said that Henning had immersed himself so thoroughly in Transcendental Meditation that he "abandoned regular medical treatment for liver cancer, continued to pursue his diet of nuts and berries, and died of the disease."

On June 8, 2010, it was announced that Henning would receive a star on Canada's Walk of Fame. His "Zig Zag Girl" illusion is housed at the American Museum of Magic.
