= Penny Harvey =

British anthropologist

Penelope M. Harvey, FBA, FAcSS (born 1956) is a British anthropologist and academic, who has undertaken ethnographic field work in Spain, Peru and the United Kingdom. Since 2000, she has been Professor of Social Anthropology at the University of Manchester.

== Early life and education ==
Having studied Spanish at King's College London, she then studied social anthropology at the London School of Economics. She completed her Doctor of Philosophy (PhD) degree in 1987; her doctoral thesis was titled "Language and the power of history: a study of bilinguals in ocongate (southern Peru)".

== Academic career ==
Harvey was a lecturer in Latin American studies at the University of Liverpool from 1985 to 1990, and then a senior lecturer in social anthropology at the University of Manchester from 1991 to 2000. In 2000, she was appointed Professor of Social Anthropology at Manchester. She was additionally Professor II at the University of Bergen (2004–2006) and the University of Oslo (2012–2019); a title given to visiting full professors in Norway. Since November 2019, she has been a member of the Committee on Radioactive Waste Management which gives independent advice and scrutiny to the British Government; she currently serves as deputy chair.

== Honours ==
In 2019, Harvey was elected Fellow of the Academy of Social Sciences (FAcSS). In July 2022, she was elected Fellow of the British Academy (FBA), the United Kingdom's national academy for the humanities and social sciences. The same year, she was elected Member of the Academia Europaea (MAE). She is also a foreign member of the Norwegian Academy of Science and Letters.

== Selected works ==
- Harvey, Penelope (1997). "INTRODUCTION: Technology as Skilled Practice: approaches from Anthropology, History and Psychology". Social Analysis: The International Journal of Social and Cultural Practice. 41 (1): 3–14. ISSN 0155-977X. JSTOR 23171728.
- Harvey, Penny; Casella, Eleanor; Evans, Gillian; Knox, Hannah; McLean, Christine; Silva, Elizabeth B.; Thoburn, Nicholas; Woodward, Kath, eds. (2014). Objects and materials: a Routledge companion. London: Routledge. ISBN 978-0415678803.
- Dalakoglou, Dimitris; Harvey, Penelope, eds. (2015). Roads and anthropology: ethnography, infrastructures, (im)mobility. London: Routledge. ISBN 978-1138803572.
- Harvey, Penelope; Knox, Hannah (2015). Roads: an anthropology of infrastructure and expertise. Ithaca London: Cornell University Press. ISBN 978-0801479649.
- Harvey, Penelope; Bruun Jensen, Casper; Morita, Atsurō (2017). Infrastructures and social complexity: a companion. Abingdon, Oxon: Routledge. ISBN 978-1138654945.
