= Barbara De Angelis =

American relationship consultant, author, TV personality

Barbara De Angelis (born March 4, 1951) is an American relationship consultant, lecturer and author, TV personality, relationship, personal growth adviser and spiritual teacher.

== Biography ==
De Angelis received a non-accredited (but state-approved) PhD in psychology from Columbia Pacific University, a now defunct institution previously located in San Rafael, California.

De Angelis is known for her books that help people find the right partner. She has written fourteen books in these fields, including the New York Times-bestselling books How to Make Love All the Time, Secrets About Men Every Woman Should Know, Are You The One for Me? and Real Moments. Her infomercial "Making Love Work" won an award as Best Infomercial of 1994. She had a short-lived talk show on CBS daytime in early 1991.

She was the founder and executive director of the Los Angeles Personal Growth Center and is president of Shakti Communications, Inc.

De Angelis was born and raised in Philadelphia, and has been married five times as of 1995. Her spouses have included magician Doug Henning and author John Gray, who, along with De Angelis while they were married, received an unaccredited PhD degree by correspondence from the now-defunct Columbia Pacific University.

== Books ==
- How To Make Love All The Time: Make Love Last a Lifetime (1991)
- Secrets about Men Every Woman Should Know. New York, N.Y.: Bantam Doubleday Dell Pub. 1991. ISBN 0-440-20841-6. OCLC 23244678.
- Are You the One for Me?: Knowing Who's Right and Avoiding Who's Wrong. Dell. 1993.
- Real Moments: Discover the Secret for True Happiness. Delacorte. 1994. ISBN 0-385-31068-4.
- Ask Barbara: The 100 Most-Asked Questions About Love, Sex and Relationships (1997)
- Real Moments for Lovers: The Enlightened Guide for Discovering Total Passion and True Intimacy (1997)
- The Real Rules: How to Find the Right Man for the Real You (1997)
- Chicken Soup for the Couple’s Soul (co-editor) (1999)
- Passion. Delacorte. 1999. ISBN 978-0-440-50815-1.
- What Women Want Men to Know: The Ultimate Book About Love, Sex and Relationships for You—and the Man You Love. Hyperion. 2002. ISBN 978-0-7868-6695-3.
- Chicken Soup for the Romantic Soul: Inspirational Stories About Love and Romance (co-editor) (2003)
- Confidence: Finding It And Living It. Hay House, Inc. 2005. ISBN 978-1-4019-2973-2.
- How Did I Get Here?: Finding Your Way to Renewed Hope and Happiness When Life and Love Take Unexpected Turns (2005)
- Secrets About Life Every Woman Should Know: Ten Principles for Total Emotional and Spiritual Fulfillment (1st ed.). New York: Hyperion. 1999. ISBN 0-7868-8993-4. OCLC 44714814.
- Soul Shifts (2015)
- The Choice For Love (2017)
