= Miser's Dream =

Magic routine

Miser's Dream is a magic routine where the magician produces coins from the air (and often other places) and drops them into a receptacle they are holding, usually a metal bucket. It has also been called "Aerial Treasury". It was invented in the 19th century and popularized by T. Nelson Downs c. 1895.

The trick is considered a crowd-pleaser, with an easy-to-follow plot based on a common desire. Its secret method usually involves palming.

== Selected performers ==
- Al Flosso
- Jeff McBride
- Penn & Teller (variation producing coins from a fish tank)
- Robert-Houdin
- T. Nelson Downs (using a hat)
- Rynku Viceroy (Contestants of The Master Indonesia Season 5)

== See also ==
- Coin snatching
