= Ellis Stanyon =

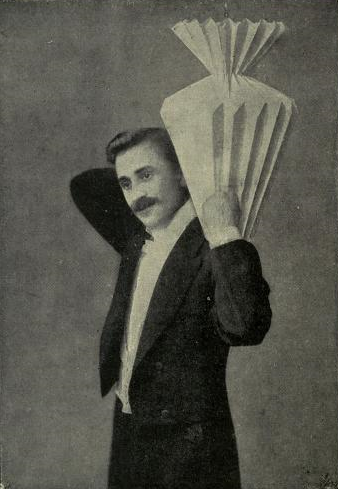
- Born: January 1870; Husbands Bosworth, Leicestershire, England
- Died: September 1951 (aged 81)
- Occupation: Magician
- Known for: Card manipulation, coin magic, creator of Stanyon's Magic, sleight of hand

William Ellis Stanyon (January 1870 – September 1951) was a professional magician and magic dealer in London.

== History ==
Stanyon published and edited his own journal known as Magic. The journal's aim was to‚ 'popularize the Art of Sleight of Hand'. It was first published in October 1900 and ran for 177 issues with a break during World War I; the final issue was published in June 1920.

Stanyon in his journal published a method of escaping from packed boxes. Biographer Kenneth Silverman has written that the magician Harry Houdini "accused Stanyon of having posted a bounty of several pounds for his secrets... Houdini dismissed the methods purveyed by Stanyon and others as being nothing like his own, "puny attempts at duplication."

Magic historian Henry R. Evans wrote that Stanyon was "one of the most prolific writers on legerdemain in the world, and his hand-books on magic are largely sought after."

== Published works ==
- Conjuring With Cards (1898)
- Hand Shadows (1900)
- New Miscellaneous Tricks (1900)
- New Coin Tricks (1900)
- New Juggling Tricks (1901)
- Card Tricks (1900)
- New Card Tricks (1900)
- Conjuring For Amateurs (1901)
- New Handkerchief Tricks (1909)
- Magic (1910)

== See also ==
- List of magicians
- Coin magic
- Sleight of hand
