= Julia T. Wood =

Julia T. Wood is a professor of Communication Studies and Humanities, with a focus on personal relationships, intimate partner violence, feminist theory, and the intersections of gender, communication, and culture. She has written or edited over 20 books and 70 articles on these topics.

== Early life and education ==
Wood was born in Bethesda, Maryland, and grew up in North Carolina where she obtained her B.A. at North Carolina State University in 1972. From there she got her M.A. at the University of North Carolina Chapel Hill in 1973 and her Ph.D. at Pennsylvania State University in 1975.

== Career ==
From 1973 to 1975, Wood was an instructor at The Pennsylvania State University. After obtaining her PhD, Wood started as an assistant professor at the University of North Carolina at Chapel Hill.

In the 1980s, Wood began her research in interpersonal communication, with a focus on the power dynamics in communication ethics. Later her focus shifted to feminism, intimate partner violence, and the gendered dynamics in culture. In these studies, she has interviewed both men and women about their experiences of abusive heterosexual relationships.

Some of the books Wood has written include Communication in Our Lives, Gendered Lives, and But I Thought You Meant...: Misunderstandings in Human Communication.

== Awards and accolades ==
Wood has earned over 30 honors and awards for her work, including the CASE Award for Professor of the year in North Carolina in 1998, Gender Scholar of the Year in 2007, and George H. Johnson Prize for Lifetime Achievement in 2010.

== Works ==
- Dennis, A. C., & Wood, J. T. (2012). “We're not going to have this conversation, but you get it ”: Black mother–daughter communication about sexual relations. Women's Studies In Communication, 35(2), 204–223.
- Wood, J. T., & Conrad, C. (1983). Paradox in the experiences of professional women. Western Journal of Speech Communication, 47(4), 305–322.
- Wood, J. T. (1992). Telling our stories: narratives as a basis for theorizing sexual harassment. Journal Of Applied Communication Research, 20(4), 349.
- Wood, J. T. (1994). Gendered media: The influence of media on views of gender. Gendered lives: Communication, gender and culture, 231–244.
- Wood, J. T. (1995). Feminist scholarship and the study of relationships. Journal of Social and Personal Relationships, 12(1), 103–120.
- Wood, J. T. (1999). " That wasn't the real him": Women's dissociation of violence from the men who enact it. Communication Quarterly, 47(3), Q1.
- Wood, J. T. (2001). The normalization of violence in heterosexual romantic relationships: Women's narratives of love and violence. Journal of Social and Personal Relationships, 18(2), 239–261.
- Wood, J. T. (2004). Monsters and victims: Male felons’ accounts of intimate partner violence. Journal of Social and Personal Relationships, 21(5), 555–576.
- Wood, J. T. (2005). Feminist standpoint theory and muted group theory: Commonalities and divergences. Women & Language, 28(2), 61–64.
- Wood, J. T. (2006). Gender, power, and violence in heterosexual relationships. D. Canary, & K. Dindia (Eds.). na.
- Wood, J. T. (2010). The can-do discourse and young women's anticipations of future. Women & Language, 33(1), 103–107.
- Wood, J. (2012). Gendered lives. Nelson Education.
