= T. Nelson Downs =

American magician (1867–1938)

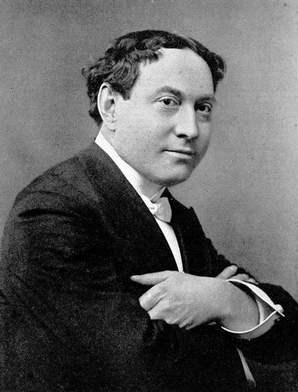
- Downs in a 1909 publication
- Born: March 16, 1867; Marshalltown, Iowa, US
- Died: September 11, 1938 (aged 71); Marshalltown, Iowa, US
- Resting place: Marshalltown, Iowa, US
- Other name: Tommy Downs
- Spouses: Nellie Stone (1869-1895); Harriett Rocky (1905-1938)
- Partner: Sam Spiegel

Thomas Nelson Downs (March 16, 1867 – September 11, 1938) was a manipulative magician known for his coin tricks. Downs was also known as "The King of Koins".

Magic historian David Price has written that Downs "was the first of the great manipulative magicians and probably the greatest of them all."

== Biography ==
Born in Marshalltown, Iowa, he was the youngest of six children in the family of Thomas and Cordelia Downs. His family moved to Iowa from the New York state. Downs' father, the Marshall county superintendent, died when his son was not even a year old.

Downs never took any training in magic; all his tricks were self-taught. By the age of 12, he became an expert in card and coin manipulation. He further mastered his skills by the age of 17, when he took a job as a railway telegrapher and had plenty of time to practice with coins.

In September 1895, Downs decided to quit his telegraphy job and launch a career in magic. At first, he toured Iowa with his partner, Sam Spiegel, a mandolinist. By 1897, Downs concentrated only on the coin tricks – a rare specialization at that time, and established himself in vaudeville, which was a popular avenue for magicians.

The success of Downs career allowed him to get booked into Tony Pastor's New York theatre, and to London's Palace Theatre soon after that.

At the peak of his career, Downs travelled frequently, and performed at royal courts. While performing his tricks, he could palm up to 60 coins at a time. One of his most famous tricks was "The Miser's Dream", in which he seemed to pull countless coins out of the thin air.

In 1912, at the age of 42, Downs decided to retire in Iowa. After moving back to Marshalltown, he rarely left the area. Not quite comfortable with idle retirement, Downs kept busy by opening a vaudeville house on Main Street, a few blocks from his own home at 7 South 3rd Avenue. He also sold a line of magic equipment. Many visitors, other magicians, streamed to his home to share gossip and the latest tricks as well as to brush elbows with the famous sleight of hand artist. The most famous of these visitors included Chung Ling Soo (William Robinson) and Dai Vernon.

Downs was a friend with the magician Harry Houdini, however, both were involved in an intense rivalry in private. Houdini had stated that Downs had operated a "fake magic shop" and was in trouble with the federal government for a "swindle." By 1896, Downs had campaigned against spiritualism, this was before Houdini's crusade against fraudulent spiritualists. In his letters, Downs claimed to have performed a stage escape from handcuffs several years before Houdini. He also took issue with Houdini's self-advertisement.

Downs wrote several books on magic before and after his retirement. His first book, Modern Coin Manipulation, was published in 1900 and is still issued in reprints today. His other books include Tricks with Coins (1902) and The Art of Magic (1909).

Downs was married twice. He had a son in his first marriage with Nellie Stone, who died in childbirth in 1895. He subsequently married Harriett Rocky on June 3, 1905.

He retired around 1928. In 1935 he was honored with a testimonial dinner.

== Death ==
Downs died on September 11, 1938, in Marshalltown, Iowa. He had suffered a stroke, which paralyzed his left side. He was buried at Riverside Cemetery in Marshalltown. His gravestone reads "King of Koins".

== Legacy ==
The Historical Society of Marshall County features a display about Downs in its museum.

== Publications ==
- Modern Coin Manipulation (1900)
- Tricks with Coins (1902)
- The Art of Magic (1909)
