= Palming =

Magic technique

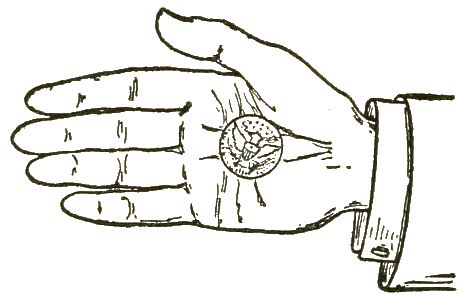
Palming a coin, from early 20th-century writings on magic by Ellis Stanyon.

Palming is a technique for holding an object in the center (palm) of the hand, without using the fingers for grasping. It is used frequently by magicians to conceal a card, coin, or other object. When it is done skilfully, the hand containing the palmed object is perceived to be completely empty by others.

== Methods ==
The methods for palming differ depending on the object intended to be concealed: its particular size, shape and flexibility. Any method of holding the object in the hand so that it cannot be directly seen by the spectators and such that the position of the hand does not arouse suspicion, i.e. the hand is perceived to be empty, can be used as a palm.

== Uses ==
Palming an object generally allows for one of four effects to take place:

- Vanishing an object can be achieved by palming it. Used properly, the object will seem to have disappeared completely, and the performer's hands will appear to be empty.
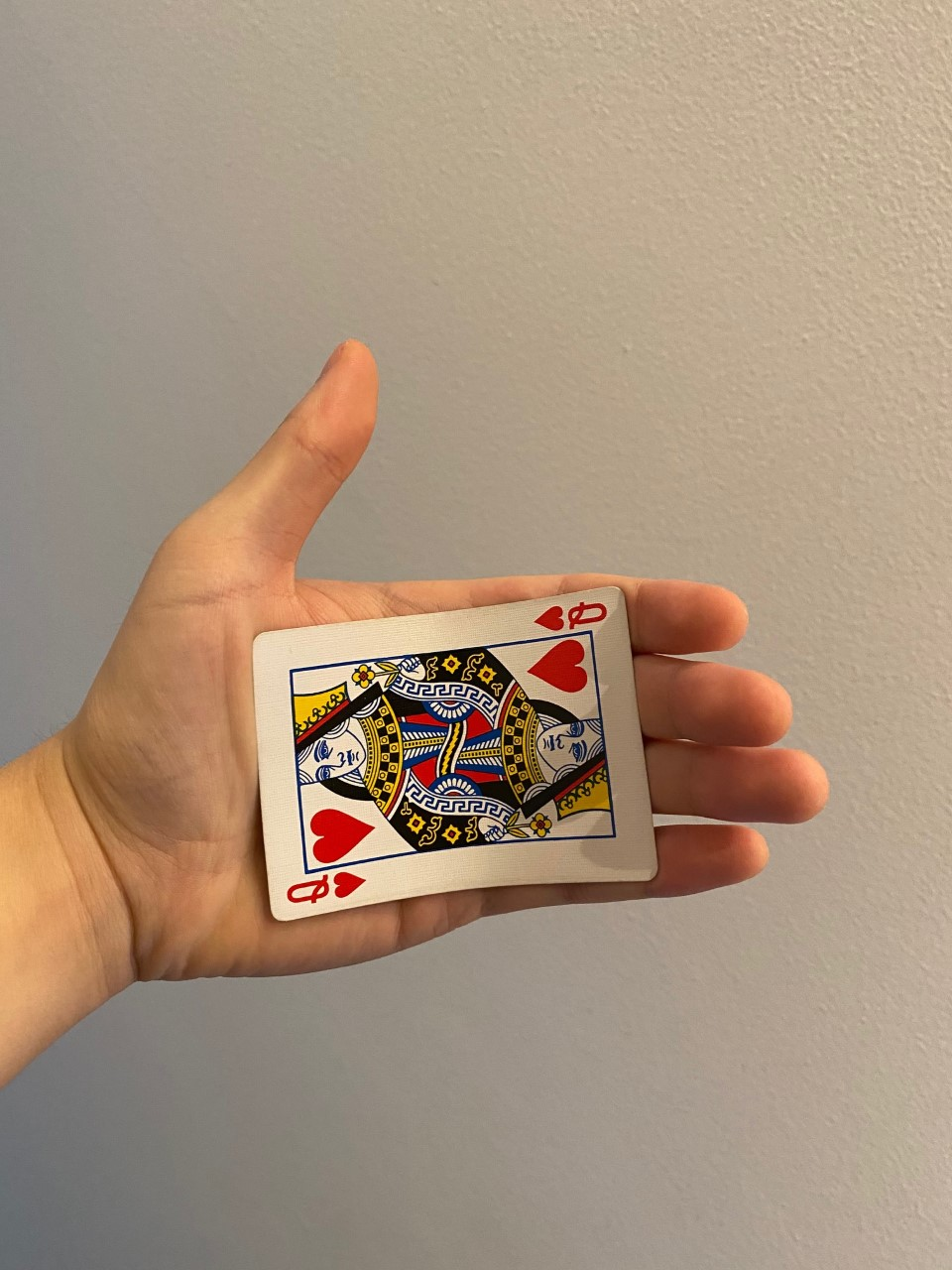
  An example of card palming, where the card is hidden from view of the audience inside the magician's hands.
- Producing an object can also be achieved by reversing the action of palming.
- Transposing two different objects can be achieved by simultaneous vanish and production.
- Transforming similar to transposing, to make an object appear to change into a different type or colour.

== See also ==
- Miser's Dream
- Sleight of hand
- Tenkai palm
