= You Just Don't Understand =

1990 book by Deborah Tannen

- First paperback edition
- Author: Deborah Tannen
- Cover artist: James B. Harris
- Language: English
- Subject: Language and gender
- Published: 1990 (Ballantine Books)
- Publication place: USA
- Pages: 330
- ISBN: 0-345-37205-0

You Just Don't Understand: Women and Men in Conversation is a 1990 non-fiction book on language and gender by Deborah Tannen, a professor of sociolinguistics at Georgetown University. It draws partly on academic research by Tannen and others, but was regarded by academics with some controversy upon its release. It was written for a popular audience, and uses anecdotes from literature and the lives of Tannen and her family, students and friends.

Tannen writes that, from childhood, boys and girls learn different approaches to language and communication; she calls these different approaches "genderlects". As a result, the book is considered a key text in the difference model. According to Tannen, women engage in "rapport-talk" — a communication style meant to promote social affiliation and emotional connection, while men engage in "report-talk" — a style focused on exchanging information with little emotional import. The differences in metamessages, Tannen claims, result in misunderstandings between men and women.

The book remained on the New York Times best seller list for nearly four years (eight months at #1) and was subsequently translated into 30 other languages. It received generally positive reviews, and some readers have even credited it with helping save their relationships. However, linguist Alice Freed has criticized Tannen's representation of the research she cites as limited and misleading, faulting her for making generalizations and contradictory claims.

== Summary ==
Tannen's chapters, which are broken up into short titled sections of two or three pages, start by distinguishing what men and women seek from conversations: independence and intimacy respectively.

For most women, the language of conversation is primarily a language of rapport: a way of establishing connections and negotiating relationships ... For most men, talk is primarily a means to preserve independence and negotiate and maintain status in a hierarchical social order.

This leads to conversations at cross-purposes, since both parties may miss the other's metamessages, with attendant misunderstandings—for example, a woman complaining about the lingering effects of a medical procedure, who may merely be seeking empathy from female friends by doing so, becomes angry at her husband when he suggests a solution involving further surgery. Men and women both perceive the other gender as the more talkative, and they are both accurate, since studies show men speak more in public settings about public topics while women dominate private conversation within and about relationships. The latter is frequently derided as gossip by both genders, and Tannen devotes an entire chapter to exploring its social functions as a way of connecting speaker and listener to a larger group.

Men often dominate conversations in public, even where they know less about a subject than a woman interlocutor, because they use conversation to establish status. Women, on the other hand, often listen more because they have been socialized to be accommodating. These patterns, which begin in childhood, mean, for instance, that men are far more likely to interrupt another speaker, and not to take it personally when they are themselves interrupted, while women are more likely to finish each other's sentences.

These patterns have paradoxical effects. Men use the language of conflict to create connections, and conversely women can use the language of connection to create conflict. "Women and men are inclined to understand each other in terms of their own styles because we assume we all live in the same world." If the genders would keep this in mind and adjust accordingly, Tannen believes, much discord between them could be averted.

== Reception ==
The book was well received by major media outlets. The New York Times called it "a refreshing and readable account of the complexities of communication between men and women." You Just Don't Understand "goes a long way toward explaining why perfectly wonderful men and women behave in ways that baffle their partners," said Judy Mann in The Washington Post.

During its four years on the Times' bestseller list, it spent eight months at the top. Tannen chose to interrupt her teaching and researching career to do book tours and appear on talk shows. Many readers thanked her for saving their marriages.

== Criticism ==
At a 1992 conference on women and language, Montclair State University linguistics professor Alice Freed gave an extended critique of You Just Don't Understand. "Its popularity and overwhelming acclaim are both astonishing and troubling," she began. "[A]n otherwise well-respected linguist has publicly and successfully promulgated a theoretical framework that is widely disputed within the academic community."

Tannen's book, Freed says, "simultaneously perpetuates negative stereotypes of women, excuses men their interactive failings, and distorts by omission the accumulated knowledge of our discipline." While Tannen accurately cites the factual findings of one researcher on the development of linguistic interaction among children, she uses them to support notions of intrinsic gender difference whereas the actual research finds greater similarities. Her readable anecdotes support unjustified generalizations that fail to take ethnic differences into account. "As an American Jewish woman married to an Irish American man," says Freed, "the constellation of conversational traits that I live with is completely at odds with those described by Tannen." She also points out that men and women are able to communicate with each other quite well when courting.

Freed also says Tannen draws different conclusions from the same anecdotes in her scholarly work. In one she uses in both a scholarly article and her book, a man interrupts a joke his wife has begun telling to finish it for her. The article explains the man's behavior as a display of dominance, while the book simply suggests the two have different understandings.
