= Deborah Tannen =

American sociolinguist (born 1945)

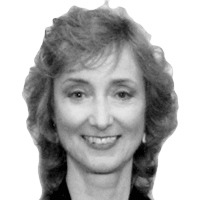
- Deborah Tannen in 2013
- Born: June 7, 1945 (age 81)
- Education: Harpur College (B.A.); Wayne State University (M.A.); University of California, Berkeley (M.A., Ph.D.)
- Occupations: Author; linguist; professor
- Notable work: You Just Don't Understand
- Website: deborahtannen.com

Deborah Frances Tannen (born June 7, 1945) is an American author and professor of linguistics at Georgetown University in Washington, D.C. Best known as the author of You Just Don't Understand, she has been a McGraw Distinguished Lecturer at Princeton University and was a fellow at the Center for Advanced Study in the Behavioral Sciences following a term in residence at the Institute for Advanced Study in Princeton, New Jersey.

Tannen is the author of thirteen books, including That's Not What I Meant! and You Just Don't Understand, the latter of which spent four years on the New York Times Best Sellers list, including eight consecutive months at number one and has been translated into multiple languages. She is also a frequent contributor to The New York Times, The Washington Post, The Atlantic, and Time magazine, among other publications.

== Education ==
Tannen graduated from Hunter College High School and completed her undergraduate studies at Harpur College (now part of Binghamton University) with a B.A. in English literature. Tannen went on to earn a master's in English literature at Wayne State University. Later, she continued her academic studies at UC Berkeley, earning an M.A. and a Ph.D. in linguistics (1979) with a dissertation entitled "Processes and consequences of conversational style". She took up a position at Georgetown in 1979 and subsequently became a Distinguished University Professor in Linguistics there.

== Writing career ==
Tannen has written and edited numerous academic publications on linguistics, discourse analysis, and interpersonal communication. She has published many books including Conversational Style: Analyzing Talk Among Friends; Talking Voices: Repetition, Dialogue and Imagery in Conversational Discourse; Gender and Discourse; and The Handbook of Discourse Analysis. Her major theoretical contribution, presented in Talking Voices, is a poetics of conversation. She demonstrates that everyday conversation is made up of linguistic features that are traditionally regarded as literary, such as repetition, dialogue, and imagery.

Tannen has also written nine general-audience books on interpersonal communication and public discourse as well as a memoir called Finding My Father: His Century-Long Journey from World War I Warsaw and My Quest to Follow . She became well known in the United States after her book You Just Don't Understand: Women and Men in Conversation was published in 1990. It remained on the New York Times Best Seller list for nearly four years, and was subsequently translated into 30 other languages. She has written several other general-audience books and mainstream articles between 1983 and 2017.

Two of her other books, You Were Always Mom's Favorite!: Sisters in Conversation Throughout Their Lives and You're Wearing THAT?: Understanding Mothers and Daughters in Conversation were also New York Times best sellers. The Argument Culture received the Common Ground Book Award, and I Only Say This Because I Love You received a Books for a Better Life Award.

== Research ==
=== Overview ===
Tannen's main research has focused on the expression of interpersonal relationships in conversational interaction. Tannen has explored conversational interaction and style differences at a number of different levels and as related to different situations, including differences in conversational style as connected to the gender and cultural background, as well as speech that is tailored for specific listeners based on the speaker's social role. In particular, Tannen has done extensive gender-linked research and writing that focused on miscommunications between men and women, which later developed into what is now known as the genderlect theory of communication. However, some linguists have argued against Tannen's claims from a feminist standpoint.

Tannen's research began when she analyzed her friends in everyday discourse while working on her Ph.D. Since then, she has collected several naturally occurring conversations on tape and conducted interviews as forms of data for later analysis. She has also compiled and analyzed information from other researchers in order to draw out notable trends in various types of conversations, sometimes borrowing and expanding on their terminology to emphasize new points of interest.

=== Gender differences in US family interaction ===
Tannen highlighted the "Telling Your Day" ritual that takes place in many U.S. families, in which, typically, the mother in a two-parent family encourages a child to share details (about their day which the mother has typically already heard about) with the father. She also emphasizes the common occurrence of the "troubles talk" ritual in women. This ritual involves a woman sharing details about "a frustrating experience" or other previously encountered problem with a confidant. She cites this ritual as an example of how, for many women, closeness is established through sharing personal details. As one example of gender-linked misinterpretations, Tannen points out that a man who is on the receiving end of "troubles talk" from his wife will often take the mention of a problem and how it was handled as an invitation to pass judgment, despite the fact that "troubles talk" is simply an expository experience meant to enhance emotional connections.

=== Interplay of connection maneuvers and power maneuvers in family conversations ===
Tannen once described family discourse as "a prime example…of the nexus of needs for both power and connection in human relationships. She coined the term "connection maneuvers" to describe interactions that take place in the closeness dimension of the traditional model of power and connection; this term is meant to contrast with the "control maneuvers", which, according to psychologists Millar, Rogers, and Bavelas, take place in the power dimension of the same model.

Tannen challenged the conventional view of power (hierarchy) and connection (solidarity) as "unidimensional and mutually exclusive" and offered her own kind of model for mapping the interplay of these two aspects of communication, which takes the form of a two-dimensional grid (Figure 1).

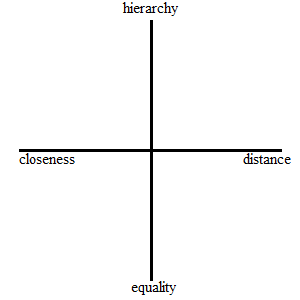
Figure 1: Tannen's Power vs. Connection grid.

In this model, the vertical axis represents the level of power in the interaction, and the horizontal axis represents connection. Having presented this model, Tannen proposed that in the American paradigm, a sibling relationship would be mapped in the bottom left quadrant, as there is a high level of closeness and a relative equality that is not comparable to the power dynamic in an American parent/child relationship. Using this new model, Tannen argues that connection maneuvers do not only occur independently of control maneuvers. Among other examples, she mentions a wife who refuses to let her husband take over making popcorn by saying "You always burn it". According to Tannen, the wife's resistance to her husband's request is a control maneuver, but by citing a potential undesirable effect for her family (i.e. burnt popcorn), she ties a connection maneuver into her attempt to enforce a decision.

Tannen also highlights ventriloquizing – which she explains as a "phenomenon by which a person speaks not only for another but also as another" – as a strategy for integrating connection maneuvers into other types of interactions. As an example of this, she cites an exchange recorded by her research team in which a mother attempts to convince her son to pick up his toys by ventriloquizing the family's dogs: "[extra high pitch] We're naughty, but we're not as naughty as Jared".

=== Conversational style ===
Tannen describes the notion of conversational style as "a semantic process" and "the way meaning is encoded in and derived from speech". She cites the work of R. Lakoff and J. Gumperz as the inspiration behind her thinking. According to Tannen, some features of conversational style are topic (which includes type of topics and how transitions occur), genre (storytelling style), pace (which includes rate of speech, occurrence or lack of pauses, and overlap), and expressive paralinguistics (pitch/amplitude shifts and other changes in voice quality).

=== "High-involvement" vs. "high-considerateness" ===
Based on a two-and-a-half hour recording of Thanksgiving dinner conversations with friends, Tannen analyzed the two prevailing conversational styles among the six participants, which she divided evenly between the categories of New Yorker and non-New Yorker. Upon analyzing the recording, Tannen came to the conclusion that the speech of the New Yorkers was characterized by exaggerated intonations (paralinguistics), overlapping speech between two or more speakers, short silences, and machine-gun questions, which she defines as questions that are "uttered quickly, timed to overlap or latch onto another's talk, and characterized by reduced syntactic form". The style of the non-New Yorkers was opposite that of the New Yorkers in all regards mentioned above; furthermore, the non-New Yorkers were caught off-guard by the New Yorkers' exaggerated intonation and overlapping questions, two factors that caused them to double down into their own conversational style at points, becoming more quiet and joining in at an even slower pace. Tannen refers to the New Yorkers' style as "high-involvement" and the unimposing style of the non-New Yorkers as "high-considerateness".

=== Indirectness in work situations ===
Tannen has expressed her stance against taking indirect speech as a sign of weakness or as a lack of confidence; she also set out to challenge the assumption that, one, indirectness indicates a lack of confidence or power, and two, that American women are generally more indirect than men. She reached this conclusion by looking through transcripts of conversations and interviews, as well as through correspondence with her readers. One example she uses against the second idea comes from a letter from a reader, who mentioned how his Navy superior trained his unit to respond to the indirect request "It's hot in this room" as a direct request to open the window. A different letter mentions the tendency of men to be more indirect when it comes to expressing feelings than women.

Tannen also mentions exchanges where both participants are male, but the two participants are not of equal social status. As a specific example, she mentions a "black box" recording between a plane captain and a co-pilot in which the captain's failure to understand the co-pilot's indirect conversational style (which was likely a result of his relatively inferior rank) caused a crash.

=== Indirectness as a sociocultural norm ===
During a trip to Greece, Tannen observed that comments she had made to her hosts about foods she had not seen yet in Greece (specifically, scrambled eggs and grapes) had been interpreted as indirect requests for the foods. This was surprising to her, since she had just made the comments in the spirit of small talk. Tannen observed this same tendency of Greeks and Greek-Americans to interpret statements indirectly in a study that involved interpreting the following conversation between a husband and a wife:

Wife: "John's having a party. Wanna go?"
Husband: "Okay."
[later]
Wife: "Are you sure you want to go to the party?"
Husband: "Okay, let's not go. I'm tired anyway."

The participants – some Greeks, some Greek-Americans, and some non-Greek Americans – had to choose between the following two paraphrases of the second line in the exchange:

[1-I]: "My wife wants to go to this party, since she asked. I'll go to make her happy."
[1-D]: "My wife is asking if I want to go to a party. I feel like going, so I'll say yes."

Tannen's findings showed that 48% of Greeks chose the first (more indirect) paraphrase, while only 32% of non-Greek Americans chose the same one, with the Greek-Americans scoring closer to the Greeks than the other Americans at 43%. These percentages, combined with other elements of the study, suggest that the degree of indirectness a listener generally expects may be affected through sociocultural norms.

Tannen provides an overview to how culture and power may subconsciously influence a speaker's preference for indirectness in her 1994 New York Times Magazine article "How to Give Orders Like a Man."

=== Agonism in written academic discourse ===
Tannen analyzed the agonistic framing of academic texts, which are characterized by their "ritualized adversativeness". She argued that expectations for academic papers in the US place the highest importance on presenting the weaknesses of an existing, opposing, argument as a basis for bolstering the author's replacement argument. According to her, agonism limits the depth of arguments and learning, since authors who follow the convention pass up opportunities to acknowledge strengths in the texts they are arguing against; in addition, this places the newest, attention-grabbing works in prime positions to be torn apart.

== Publications ==
- Lilika Nakos (Twayne World Authors Series, G. K. Hall, 1983)
- Conversational Style: Analyzing Talk Among Friends (1984; 2nd Edition Oxford University Press, 2005)
- That's Not What I Meant! How Conversational Style Makes or Breaks Relationships (Ballantine, 1986, ISBN 0-345-34090-6)
- Talking Voices: Repetition, dialogue, and imagery in conversational discourse (Cambridge University Press, 1989, hardcover ISBN 0-521-37001-9, paperback ISBN 0521379008, 2nd edition 2007)
- You Just Don't Understand: Women and Men in Conversation (Ballantine, 1990, ISBN 0-688-07822-2; Quill, 2001, ISBN 0-06-095962-2)
- Talking from 9 to 5: Women and Men at Work (Avon, 1994, ISBN 0-688-11243-9; ISBN 0-380-71783-2)
- Gender and Discourse (Oxford University Press, 1996, ISBN 0-19-508975-8; ISBN 0-19-510124-3)
- The Argument Culture: Stopping America's War of Words (Ballantine, 1998, ISBN 0-345-40751-2)
- I Only Say This Because I Love You: Talking to Your Parents, Partner, Sibs, and Kids When You're All Adults (Ballantine, 2001, ISBN 0-345-40752-0)
- You're Wearing THAT?: Mothers and Daughters in Conversation (Ballantine, 2006, ISBN 1-4000-6258-6)
- You Were Always Mom's Favorite!: Sisters in Conversation Throughout Their Lives (Random House, 2009, ISBN 1-4000-6632-8)
- Finding My Father: His Century-Long Journey from World War I Warsaw and My Quest to Follow (Ballantine Books, 2020, ISBN 9781101885833)
