= Chinese Water Torture Cell =

Predicament escape

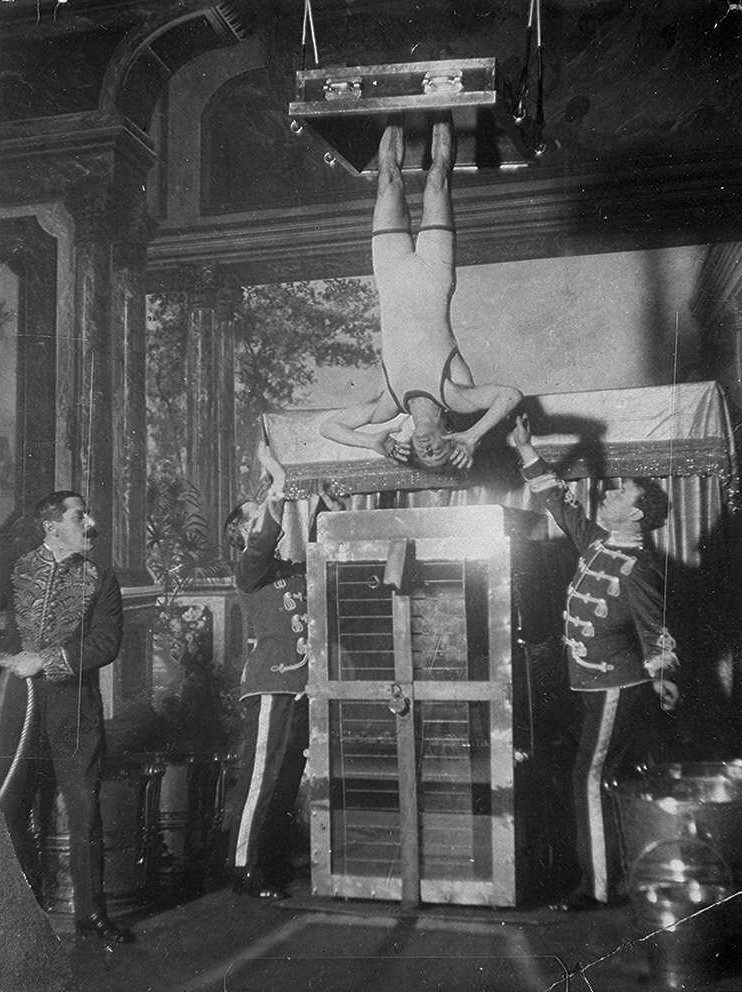
Houdini performing the Chinese Water Torture Cell (c. 1913)

The Chinese Water Torture Cell is a predicament escape made famous by Hungarian-American escape artist Harry Houdini. The illusion consists of three parts: first, the magician's feet are locked in stocks; next, he is suspended in mid-air from his ankles with a restraint brace; finally, he is lowered into a glass tank overflowing with water and the restraint is locked to the top of the cell.

== History ==
The original Chinese Water Torture Cell was built in England in 1911. Houdini first performed the escape for an audience of one person as part of a one-act play he called Houdini Upside Down!. This was so he could copyright the new escape (having learned with his Milk Can escape that patents failed to stop imitators). The first public performance was at the Circus Busch in Berlin, Germany, on September 21, 1912. In letters Houdini referred to the effect as Upside Down or USD. Houdini continued to perform the escape until his death in 1926. Despite two Hollywood movies depicting Houdini dying in the Torture Cell, the escape had nothing to do with his demise.

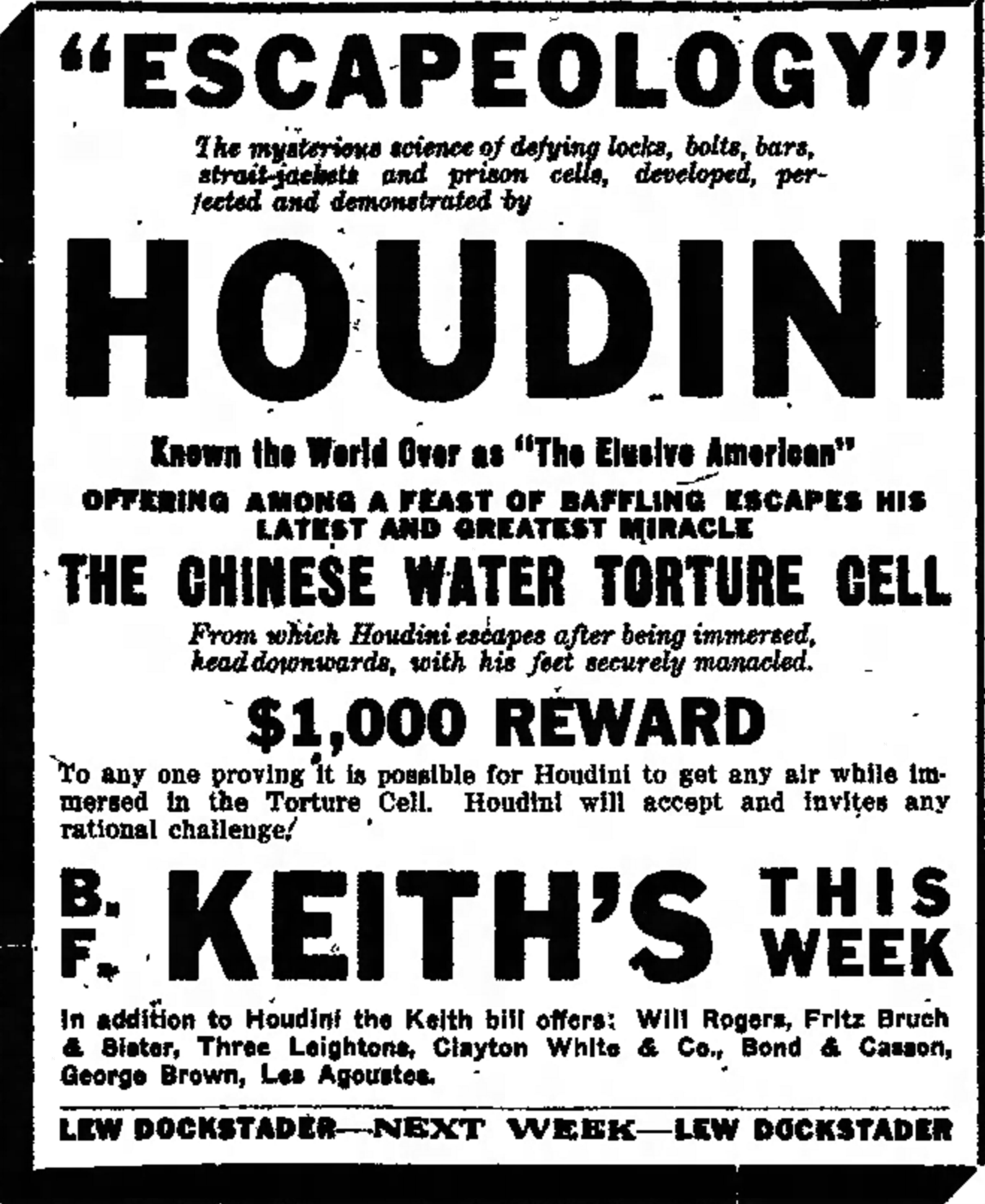
Newspaper advertising Houdini's Chinese water torture cell act (1915)

After Houdini's death, the cell was willed to his brother Theodore Hardeen. Hardeen never performed the cell himself, and despite Houdini's instructions for it to be "burned and destroyed" upon Hardeen's death, his brother gave the cell to Houdini collector Sidney Hollis Radner in the 1940s. The cell remained in Radner's basement until 1971 when it was put on display at The Houdini Magical Hall of Fame in Niagara Falls, Canada. Here the cell suffered from neglect and theft. At one point, the museum owners put a fish tank inside the cell to achieve an aquarium effect. The leaky tank caused mold and damage to the cell wood and structure.

In 1995, the Houdini Magical Hall of Fame burned to the ground. It was initially reported that the cell was completely destroyed, but the metal frame survived and the cell was restored by illusion builder John Gaughan. In 2004, the restored cell was sold at auction to magician David Copperfield. It now resides as part of his massive private magic collection in his home in Las Vegas, Nevada.

Sidney Radner gave the burned wood, screws, nails, metal straps and many other unused pieces of the original Water Torture Cell to Geno Munari. In August 1998, John Gaughan subsequently sent those items to Geno Munari, owner of Houdini's Magic Shops, in Las Vegas. Additionally, Geno Munari provided John Gaughan an original back-up Water Torture Cell glass plate from The Houdini Museum in Las Vegas. This backup glass traveled with Houdini as a spare in case the Water Torture Cell had to be axed to save Houdini's life.

In 2003, an exact duplicate of the Water Torture Cell was discovered, leading to controversy over the authenticity of the restored cell. Sidney Radner filed suit against John Gaughan.

In 2012, a previously unpublished photo of Houdini performing his Water Torture Cell in 1920 was discovered and put on display in Scotland. The photo shows two horizontal bands wrapped around the cell.

== Modern interpretations ==
Several magicians and escape artists have performed the escape since Houdini, among them Al Marks (1940s, using a steel tank with no window), Dill-Russel and Norman Bigelow.

In the 1950s, magician Leo Irby performed the escape for You Asked for It.

In 1975, magician Doug Henning (b. 1948 — d. 2000) performed a version of the Water Torture Cell during his first live television special on NBC. In his version, a twist ending revealed the magician to be one of the hooded ax-wielding assistants standing beside the cell.

In the Happy Days episode "The Magic Show" (original airdate December 5, 1978), magician James Randi is scheduled to perform the trick (referred to as "the milkcan escape"), which has supposedly been successfully performed only by three magicians (including Randi himself), as part of a magic show at a charity function, but he inadvertently drinks alcohol and becomes too intoxicated to do so. The Fonz takes over Randi's act and performs admirably, but the audience insists on seeing the milkcan escape. Unwilling to fail the charity recipients, the Fonz enters the tank. By now, Randi has recovered and, horrified to learn the Fonz has been in the tank for nearly half a minute, insists he be released before he drowns, but the Fonz surprises everyone present by successfully escaping without assistance. According to the episode's opening credits, all magic tricks during the episode, including the milkcan escape, were performed without special effects.

In the spring of 1980, John R. Hall (author, blogger, magician) (stage name Keoni - pronounced key-OH-nee) purchased a Chinese Water Torture Cell from Tony Spina of Tannen's Magic Shop (a magicians supply company in New York City) and performed the escape on 5 October 1980 for broadcast television's PM Magazine. The Chinese Water Torture Cell purchased by Keoni was represented by Tannen's as a duplicate of the cell constructed for Doug Henning's live television broadcast on NBC. Like Doug Henning's performance, Keoni's escape ended with a twist, when the curtain around the cell was lowered, the cell was empty and Keoni retook the stage by running from the back of the theaters and down the aisles back to the stage.

Escape artist Kristen Johnson performs a water cell escape that was inspired by Houdini's trick. Johnson's stunt is significantly different in that she remains in full view of the audience throughout the escape. She performed her 1,000th water torture cell on November 4, 2012, at the Atlanta Motor Speedway and is known in the industry as doing a legitimate three minute plus breath hold in the water torture cell. Johnson has performed her version at NBA half time shows and has been seen on ESPN's SportsCenter.

In 2003, 2012, 2013, and again in 2016, Chicago magician Dennis Watkins performed the Chinese Water Torture Cell while playing the role of Harry Houdini in Death and Harry Houdini produced by the [House Theatre of Chicago]. Watkins' interpretation of the Water Torture Cell is performed within 5 feet of the audience, and is performed in a cell that is 2'x 2'x 6', which leaves almost no room for maneuvering. Watkins has performed the illusion nearly 100 times, including public performances at Chicago's Navy Pier, as well as in earlier versions of Death and Harry Houdini.

In September 2010, escape artist Alexanderia the Great, performed a smaller more confined version of the Chinese Water Torture Cell in full view (no curtains) that she calls UC or the Underwater Cell. A recent performance was in a front-page story for the Metrowest Daily newspaper.

In July 2013, celebrating the 100th anniversary, Richard Sherry and Female Escape Artist Dayle Krall, released their 21st Century Chinese Water Torture Cell. This cell is a variation of Houdini's original creation, with an inner cage and two outer crossbars.
