= Charles Morritt =

English stage magician (1860–1936)

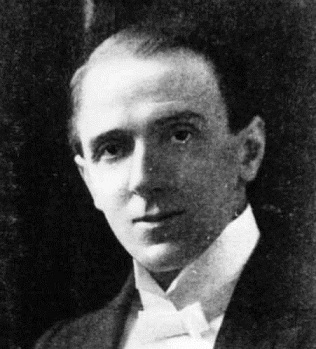
- Born: 13 June 1860; Saxton Hall
- Died: 10 April 1936 (aged 75); Chorley Isolation Hospital England
- Occupations: Magician, hypnotist, mentalist and inventor

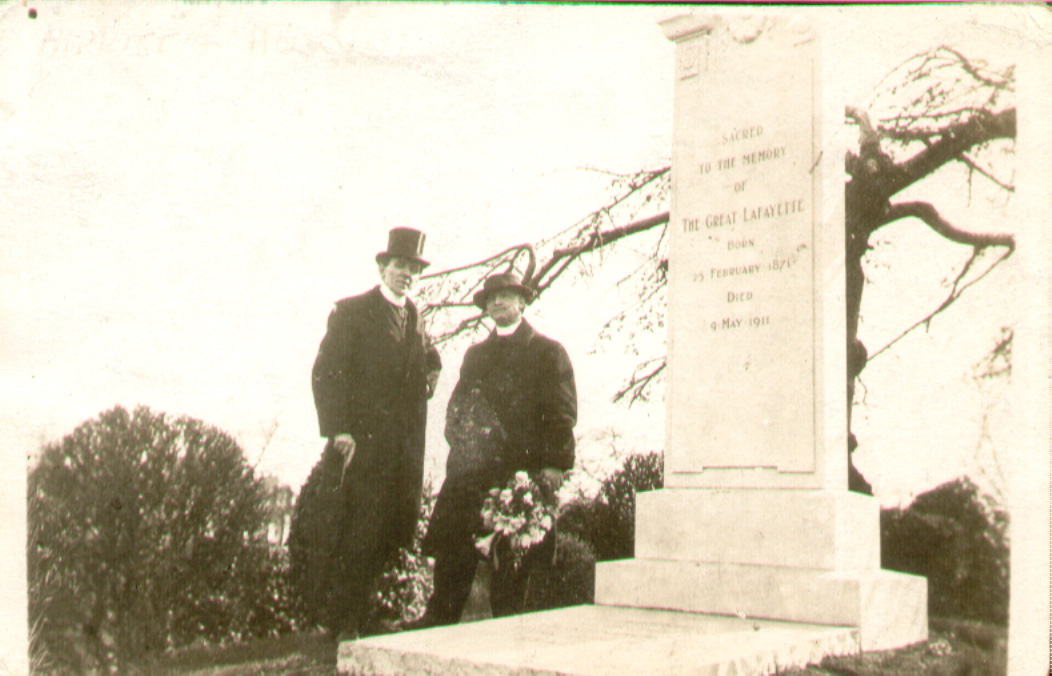
Houdini & Morritt at the grave of the magician Lafayette

Charles Morritt (1860 – 1936) was an English magician, hypnotist, mentalist and inventor.

== Life and career ==
Morritt was the son of an elderly gentleman farmer, William, and his young gypsy housekeeper, whom he had married at the age of 51. As a teenager Charles worked as a packer in a woollen warehouse in Leeds. He taught himself card tricks and hypnotism in his spare time.

Aged 18, Morritt gave a two-hour show at the Public Hall in Selby. On stage, Morritt performed as "The Professor".

He was something of an impresario, having taken over the lease of two theatres and the management of several more in the North of England by 1881.

He later honed his magic under the tutelage of John Nevil Maskelyne.

In 1915, Morritt presented his latest invention, the Tally Ho! trick. An "entire fox hunt": two huntsmen with rifles, a hunting dog, and a lady in green velvet riding on the back of a live horse, were produced from a cabinet.

Morritt knew Harry Houdini well, selling him several tricks, including adapting his own Disappearing Donkey routine into a vanishing elephant trick for Houdini.

Charles Morritt had an assistant, Ada; her full name was Adela Brown Howell. They married in 1883.

== Trial ==
In 1928, Morritt appeared at Halifax court charged with obtaining money by false pretences over his "Man in a Trance" trick. The magicians P. T. Selbit and Will Goldston helped to fund Morritt's defence and he was eventually acquitted.

After the trial, the then 68-year-old magician moved to Morecambe with his assistant Bessie and never worked again. He died of tuberculosis in 1936.
