= Nino Pecoraro =

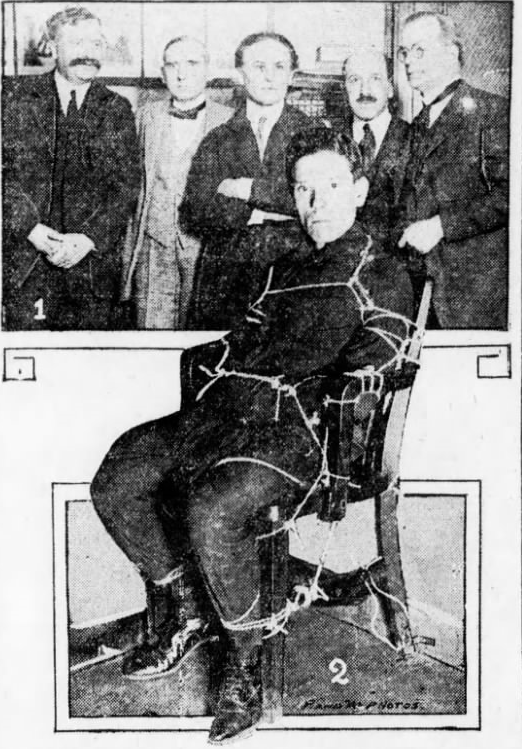
Nino Pecoraro

Nino Pecoraro (1899–1973) was an Italian spiritualist medium who was exposed as a fraud.

Pecoraro from Naples worked as a spiritualist medium. He claimed his spirit guide was Eusapia Palladino, a deceased medium. The psychical researcher Hereward Carrington introduced Pecoraro to the spiritualist Arthur Conan Doyle in America. Pecoraro who was tied up during a séance by Carrington, managed to impress Doyle by making musical instruments play.

Carrington persuaded Pecoraro to participate in the Scientific American contest. In four days in December, 1923 he was tested by members of the committee. He was tied to a chair with sixty feet of rope. Beside him was placed a table with musical instruments. During the séances various movements and sounds of objects were heard. He had managed to impress some of the committee members who considered the phenomena genuine. However, O. D. Munn, the publisher of the Scientific American, suspected that he had freed his hand to play the instruments.

The magician Harry Houdini had not been informed of the test sessions, but managed to get to the fourth séance. Houdini suggested that Percorao was an escape artist who freed himself from the rope that bound him to his chair. Before the séance, Houdini had cut the rope into shorter pieces and tied Pecoraro to the chair. Because of the tight control, no phenomena occurred. In 1931, Pecoraro confessed his fraud in a newspaper interview.

Later in life he became an artist. Two of his paintings are on exhibit at The Houdini Museum in Scranton, PA.
