= Harry Houdini =

American escapologist and stuntman (1874–1926)

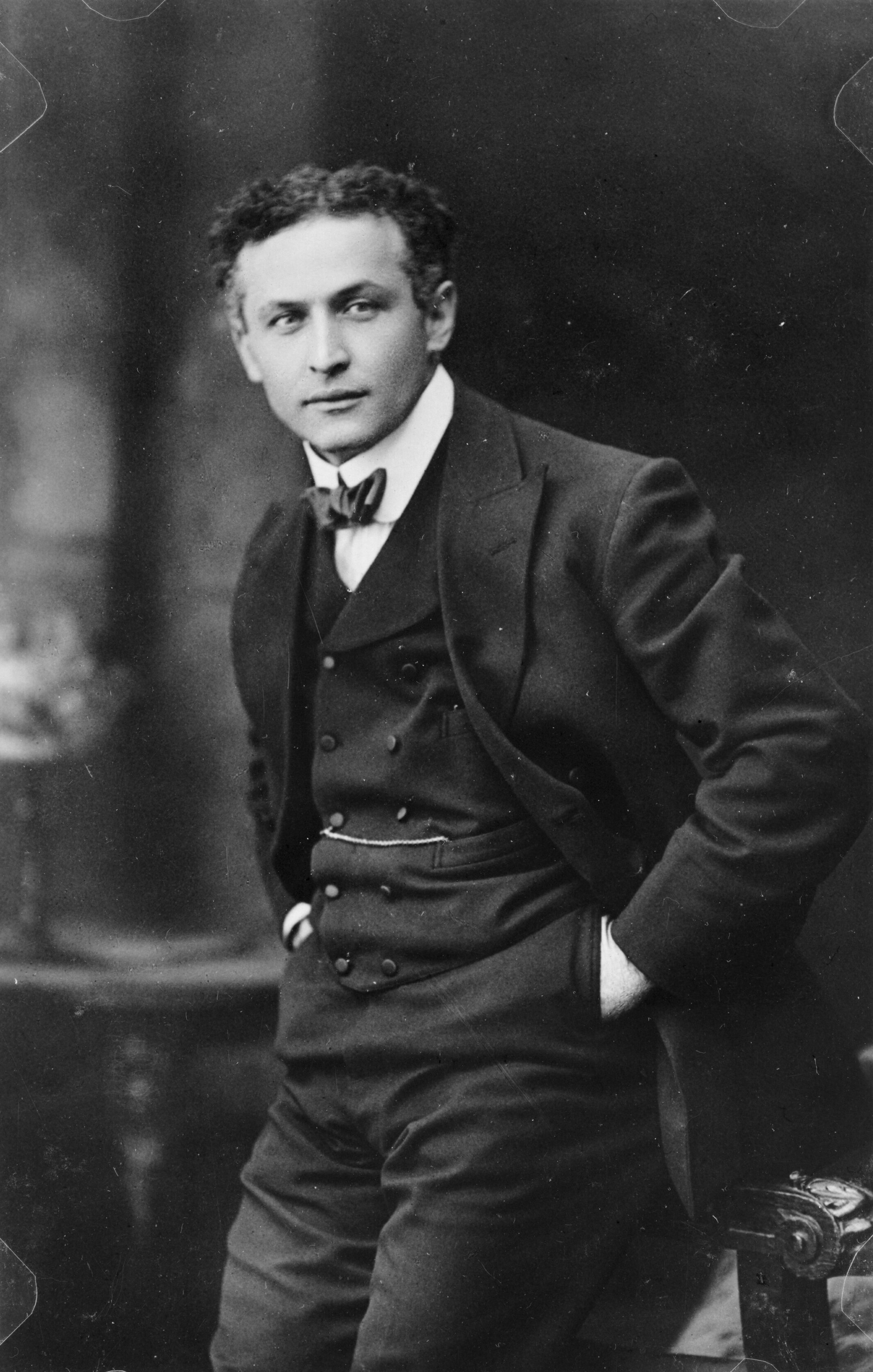
- Houdini, c. 1913
- Born: Erik Weisz; March 24, 1874; Budapest, Austria-Hungary
- Died: October 31, 1926 (aged 52); Detroit, Michigan, U.S.
- Resting place: Machpelah Cemetery
- Occupations: Illusionist; escapologist; stunt performer
- Years active: 1891–1926
- Spouse: Bess Rahner (m. 1894)
- Relatives: Theodore Hardeen (brother)

Erik Weisz (March 24, 1874 – October 31, 1926), known professionally as Harry Houdini (/huːˈdiːni/ hoo-DEE-nee), was an American escapologist, illusionist, and stunt performer noted for his escape acts.

Born in Hungary, Houdini first appeared in vaudeville in the United States and then as Harry "Handcuff" Houdini on a tour of Europe, where he challenged police forces to keep him locked up. He extended his repertoire to include escaping from a variety of restraints such as chains, straitjackets slung from skyscrapers, nailed packing cases lowered under water, and a sealed milk can filled with water.

In 1904, thousands watched as Houdini tried to escape from special handcuffs commissioned by London's Daily Mirror, keeping them in suspense for an hour. Another stunt saw him buried alive and only just able to claw himself to the surface, emerging in a state of near-breakdown. Houdini was the scourge of fake spiritualists, pursuing a personal crusade to expose their fraudulent methods. As president of the Society of American Magicians, he was keen to uphold professional standards and expose fraudulent artists. He was also quick to sue anyone who imitated his escape stunts.

Houdini made several films but gave up acting when it failed to bring in money. He was also an aviator and became the first man to fly a powered aircraft in Australia.

== Early life ==
Weisz was born in Budapest, then part of Austria-Hungary, to a Jewish family. His parents were Rabbi Mayer Sámuel Weisz and Cecilia Steiner. Houdini was fourth of seven children: Herman M., who was Houdini's half-brother by Rabbi Weisz's first marriage; Nathan J.; Gottfried William; Theodore; Leopold D.; and Carrie Gladys, who was left almost blind after a childhood accident.

The Weisz family left Hungary to escape antisemitic discrimination. They arrived in the United States on July 3, 1878, on the SS Frisia with his mother (who was pregnant) and his four brothers. The family changed their name to the German spelling Weiss, and Erik became Ehrich. The family lived in Appleton, Wisconsin, where his father served as rabbi of the Zion Reform Jewish Congregation.

According to the 1880 US census, the family lived on Appleton Street in an area which is now known as Houdini Plaza. On June 6, 1882, Rabbi Weiss became an American citizen. Losing his job at Zion in 1882, Rabbi Weiss and family moved to Milwaukee and fell into dire poverty. In 1887, Rabbi Weiss moved with Ehrich to New York City, where they lived in a boarding house on East 79th Street. He was joined by the rest of the family once Rabbi Weiss found permanent housing. As a child, Ehrich Weiss took several jobs, making his public début as a nine-year-old trapeze artist, calling himself "Ehrich, the Prince of the Air."

== Magic career ==
When Weisz became a professional magician, he began calling himself "Harry Houdini" after the French magician Jean-Eugène Robert-Houdin, whose autobiography he read in 1890. In later life, Houdini claimed the first part of his new name, Harry, was an homage to American magician Harry Kellar whom he also admired – though it was likely adapted from "Ehri", a nickname for "Ehrich", which is how he was known to his family.

A teenage Houdini was coached by magician Joseph Rinn at the Pastime Athletic Club.

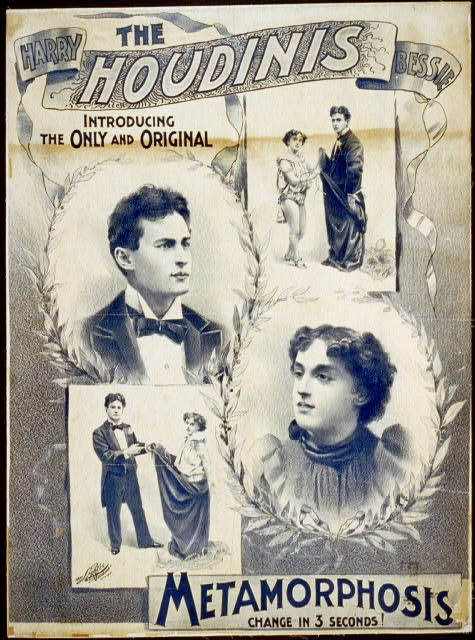
1895 poster for The Houdinis

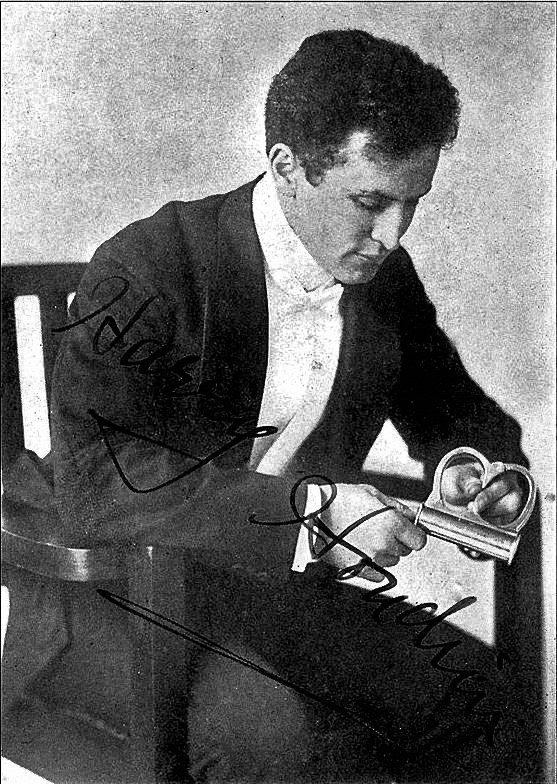
Houdini, c. 1900

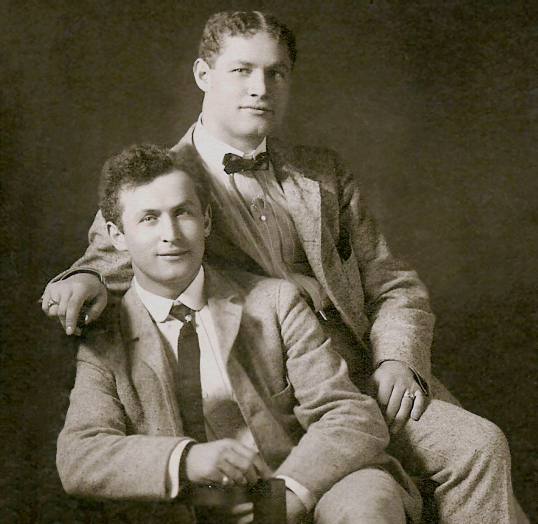
Hardeen with his brother, Houdini (seated left) c. 1901

Houdini began his magic career in 1891, but had little success. He appeared in a tent act with strongman Emil Jarrow. He performed in dime museums and sideshows, and even doubled as "The Wild Man" at a circus. Initially, Houdini focused on traditional card tricks. At one point, he billed himself as the "King of Cards". Some – but not all – professional magicians came to regard Houdini as a competent but not particularly skilled sleight-of-hand artist, lacking the grace and finesse required to achieve excellence in that craft. He soon began experimenting with escape acts.

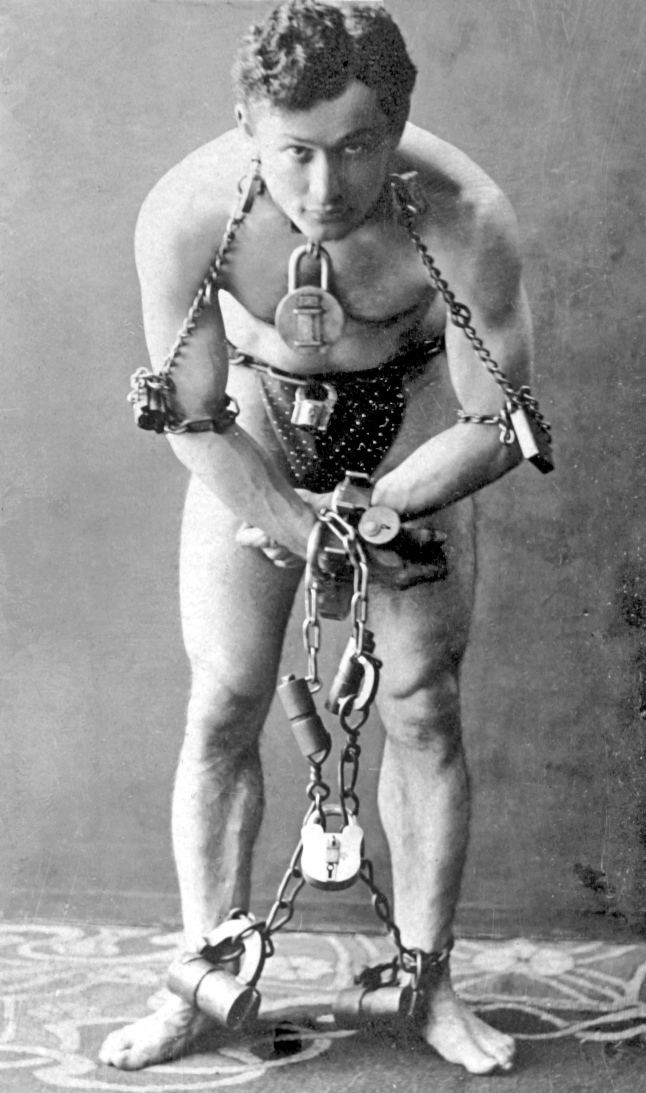
Houdini in a publicity shoot wearing chains and padlocks, 1899

In the early 1890s, Houdini and his brother "Dash" (Theodore) were performing as "The Brothers Houdini". They performed at the Chicago World's Fair in 1893 before returning to New York City and working at Huber's Dime Museum for "near-starvation wages".

In 1894 Houdini met a fellow performer, Wilhelmina Beatrice "Bess" Rahner. Bess was initially courted by Dash but fell in love with and married Harry. She replaced Dash in the act, which became known as The Houdinis. Bess worked as her husband's stage assistant for the rest of Houdini's performing career.

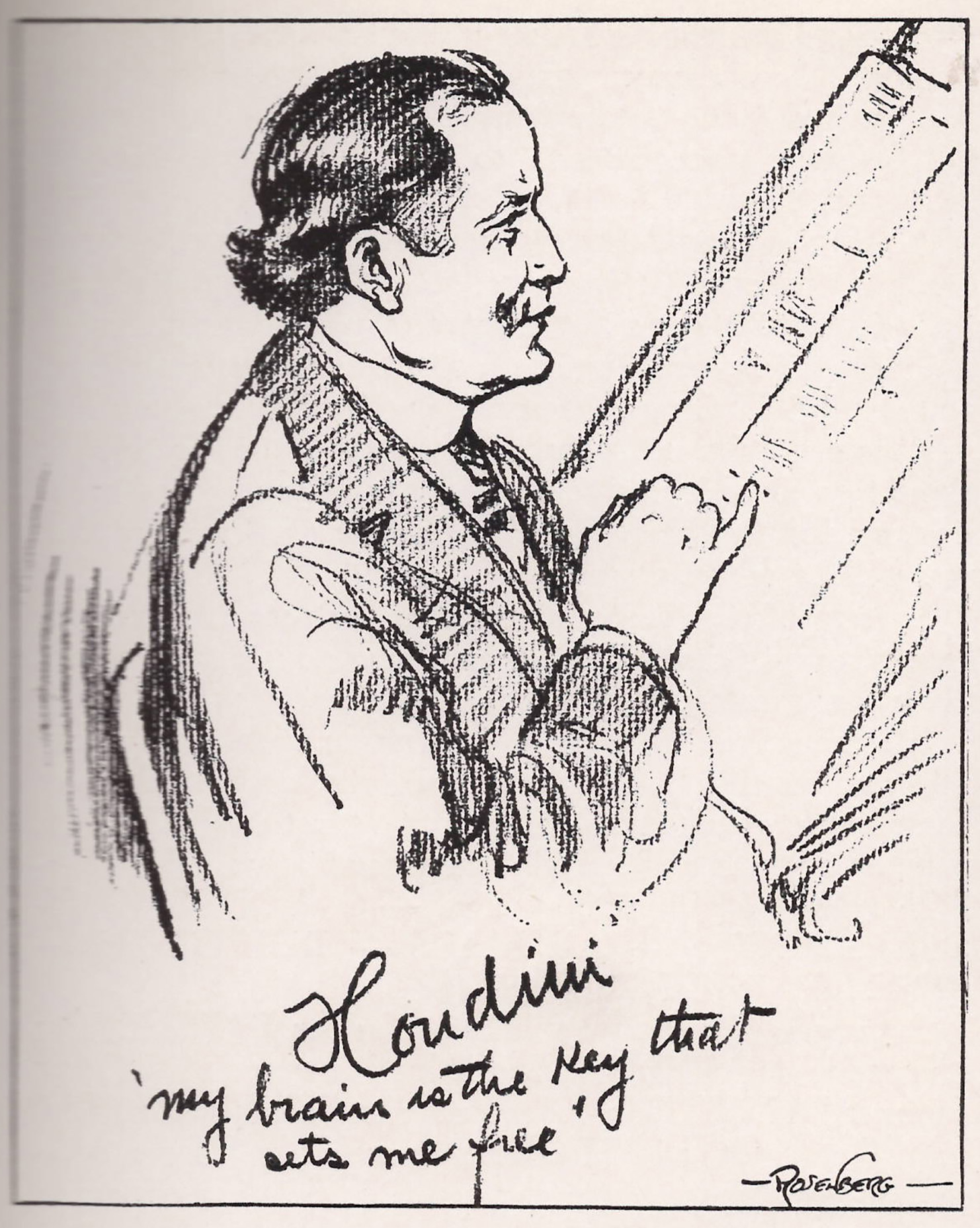
Signed drawing by Manuel Rosenberg 1927

On January 11, 1899, Houdini was defeated by a pair of handcuffs while performing at Middleton's Clark St Dime Museum in Chicago, Houdini's big break came in 1899 when he met manager Martin Beck in Saint Paul, Minnesota. Impressed by Houdini's handcuffs act, Beck advised him to concentrate on escape acts and booked him on the Orpheum vaudeville circuit. Within months he was performing at the top vaudeville houses in the country.

In 1900 Beck arranged for Houdini to tour Europe. After some days of unsuccessful interviews in London, Houdini's British agent Harry Day helped him to get an interview with C. Dundas Slater, then manager of the Alhambra Theatre. He was introduced to William Melville and gave a demonstration of escape from handcuffs at Scotland Yard. He succeeded in baffling the police so effectively that he was booked at the Alhambra for six months. His show was an immediate hit and his salary rose to $300 a week (equivalent to $11,610 in 2025).

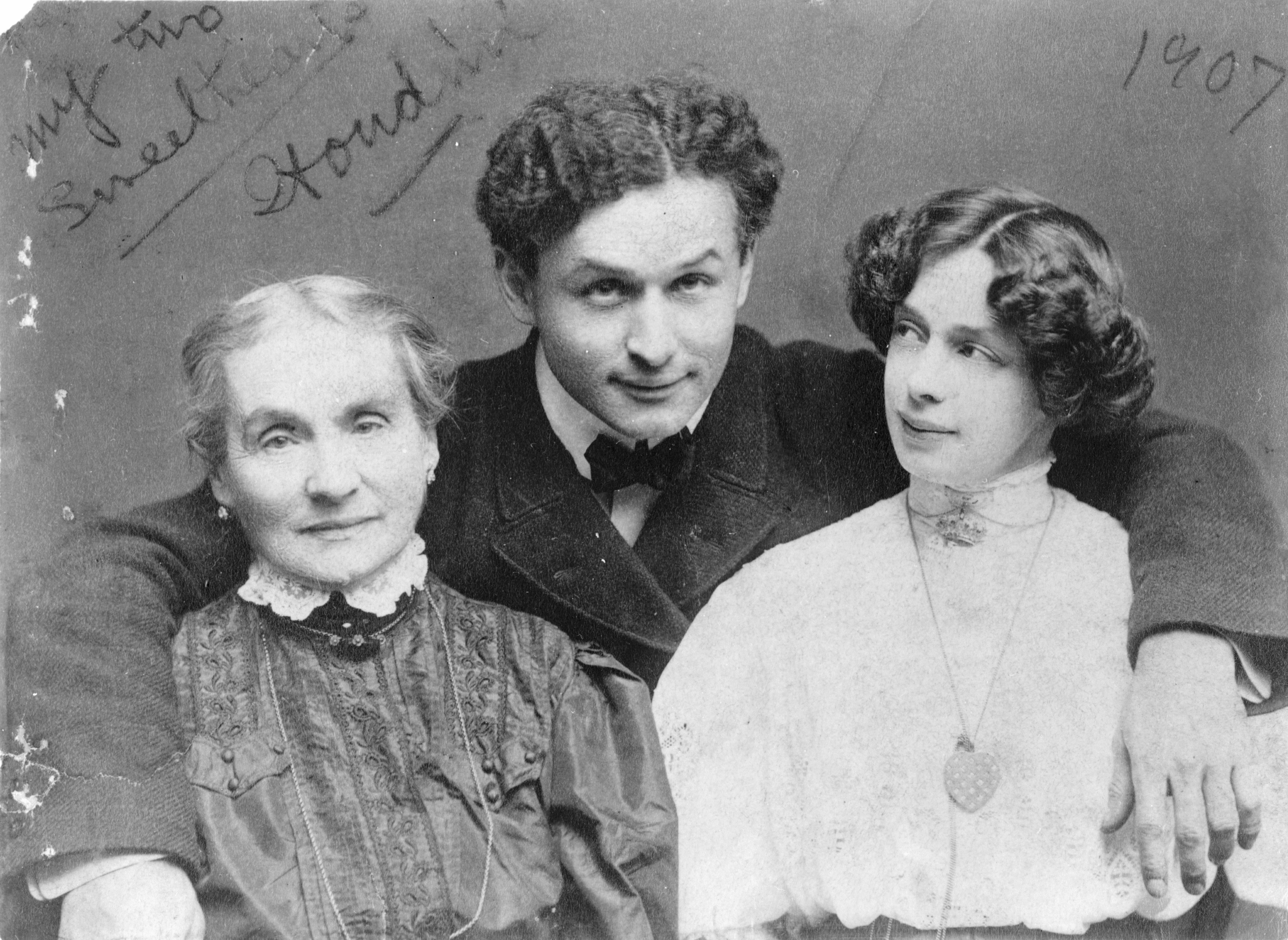
"My Two Sweethearts" – Houdini with his mother and wife, c. 1907

Between 1900 and 1920 Houdini appeared in theatres all over Great Britain performing escape acts, illusions, card tricks and outdoor stunts, becoming one of the world's highest-paid entertainers. He also toured the Netherlands, Germany, France and Russia and became widely known as The Handcuff King. In each city Houdini challenged local police to restrain him with shackles and lock him in their jails. In many of these challenge escapes he was first stripped nude and searched. In Moscow he escaped from a Siberian prison transport van, claiming that, had he been unable to free himself, he would have had to travel to Siberia, where the only key was kept.

In Cologne Houdini sued a police officer, Werner Graff, who alleged that he made his escapes via bribery. Houdini won the case when he opened the judge's safe. (He later said the judge had forgotten to lock it.) With his new-found wealth Houdini purchased a dress said to have been made for Queen Victoria, then arranged a grand reception where he presented his mother, wearing the dress, to all their relatives. Houdini said it was the happiest day of his life. In 1904 Houdini returned to the U.S. and purchased a house for $25,000 (equivalent to $895,833 in 2025), a brownstone at 278 W. 113th Street in Harlem, New York City.

While on tour in Europe in 1902 Houdini visited Blois with the aim of meeting the widow of Emile Houdin, the son of Jean-Eugène Robert-Houdin, for an interview and permission to visit his grave. He did not receive permission but visited the grave regardless. Houdini felt he had been dealt with unfairly and later wrote a negative account of the incident in his magazine, claiming he was "treated most discourteously by Madame W. Emile Robert-Houdin". In 1906 he sent a letter to the French magazine L'Illusionniste stating: "You will certainly enjoy the article on Robert Houdin I am about to publish in my magazine. Yes, my dear friend, I think I can finally demolish your idol, who has so long been placed on a pedestal that he did not deserve."

In 1906 Houdini created his own publication, the Conjurers' Monthly Magazine. It competed with The Sphinx, but was short-lived and only two volumes were released until August 1908. Magic historian Jim Steinmeyer noted that "Houdini couldn't resist using the journal for his own crusades, attacking his rivals, praising his own appearances, and subtly rewriting history to favor his view of magic."

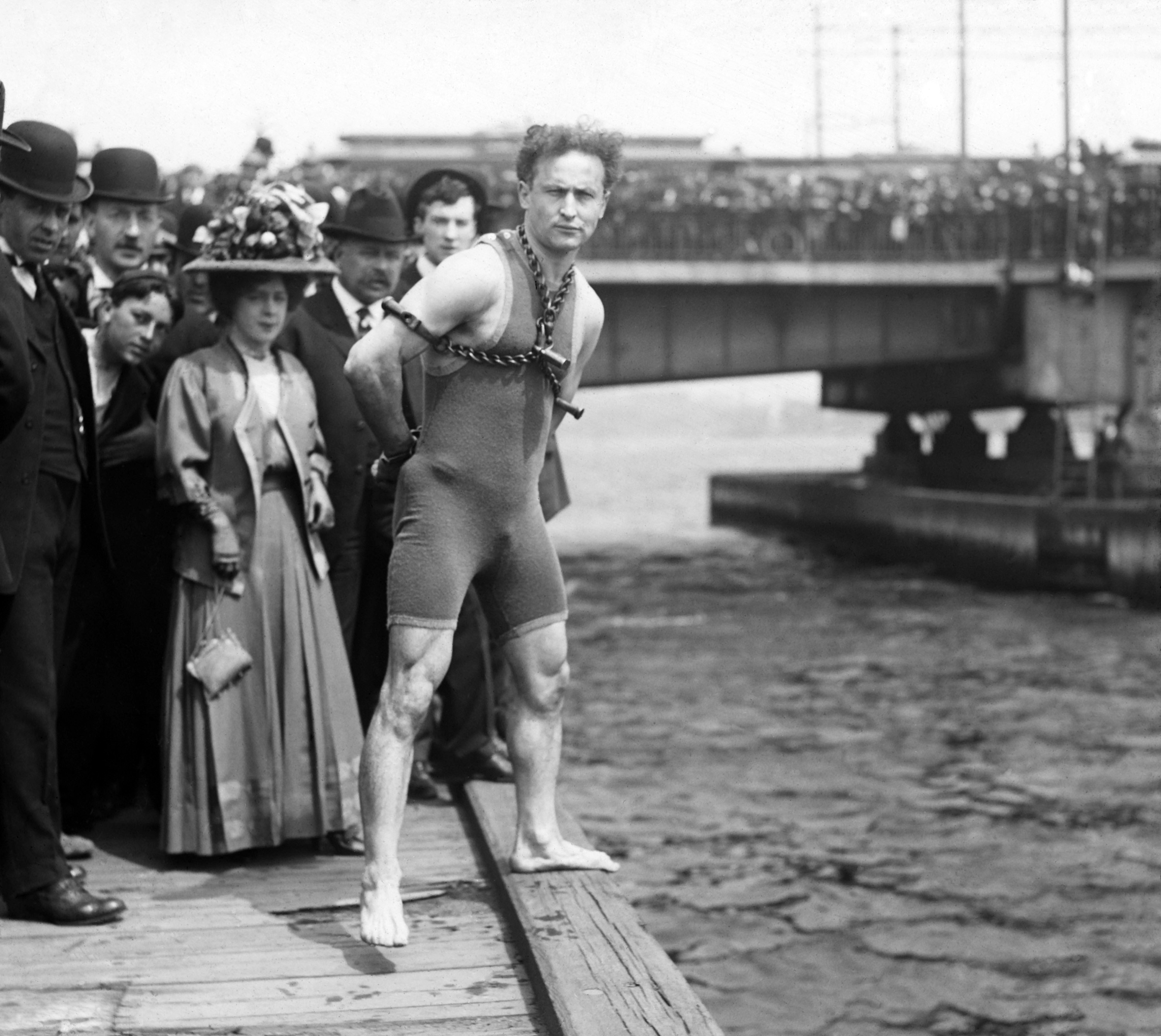
Harry Houdini before he jumped off the Harvard Bridge in Boston in 1908

From 1907 and throughout the 1910s Houdini performed with great success in the United States. He freed himself from jails, handcuffs, chains, ropes and straitjackets, often while hanging from a rope in sight of street audiences. Because of imitators, Houdini put his "handcuff act" behind him on January 25, 1908, and began escaping from a locked, water-filled milk can. The possibility of failure and death thrilled his audiences. Houdini also expanded his repertoire with his escape challenge act, in which he invited the public to devise contraptions to hold him. These included nailed packing crates (sometimes lowered into water), riveted boilers, wet sheets, mail bags, and even the belly of a whale that had washed ashore in Boston. Brewers in Scranton, Pennsylvania, and other cities challenged Houdini to escape from a barrel after they had filled it with beer.

Many of these challenges were arranged with local merchants in one of the first uses of mass tie-in marketing. Rather than promote the idea that he was assisted by spirits, as did the Davenport Brothers and others, Houdini's advertisements showed him making his escapes via dematerializing, although Houdini himself never claimed to have supernatural powers.

After much research, Houdini wrote a collection of articles on the history of magic, which were expanded into The Unmasking of Robert-Houdin published in 1908. He attacked his former idol Robert-Houdin as a liar and a fraud for having claimed the invention of automata and effects such as aerial suspension, which had been in existence for many years. Many of the allegations in the book were dismissed by magicians and researchers who defended Robert-Houdin. Magician Jean Hugard would later write a full rebuttal to Houdini's book.

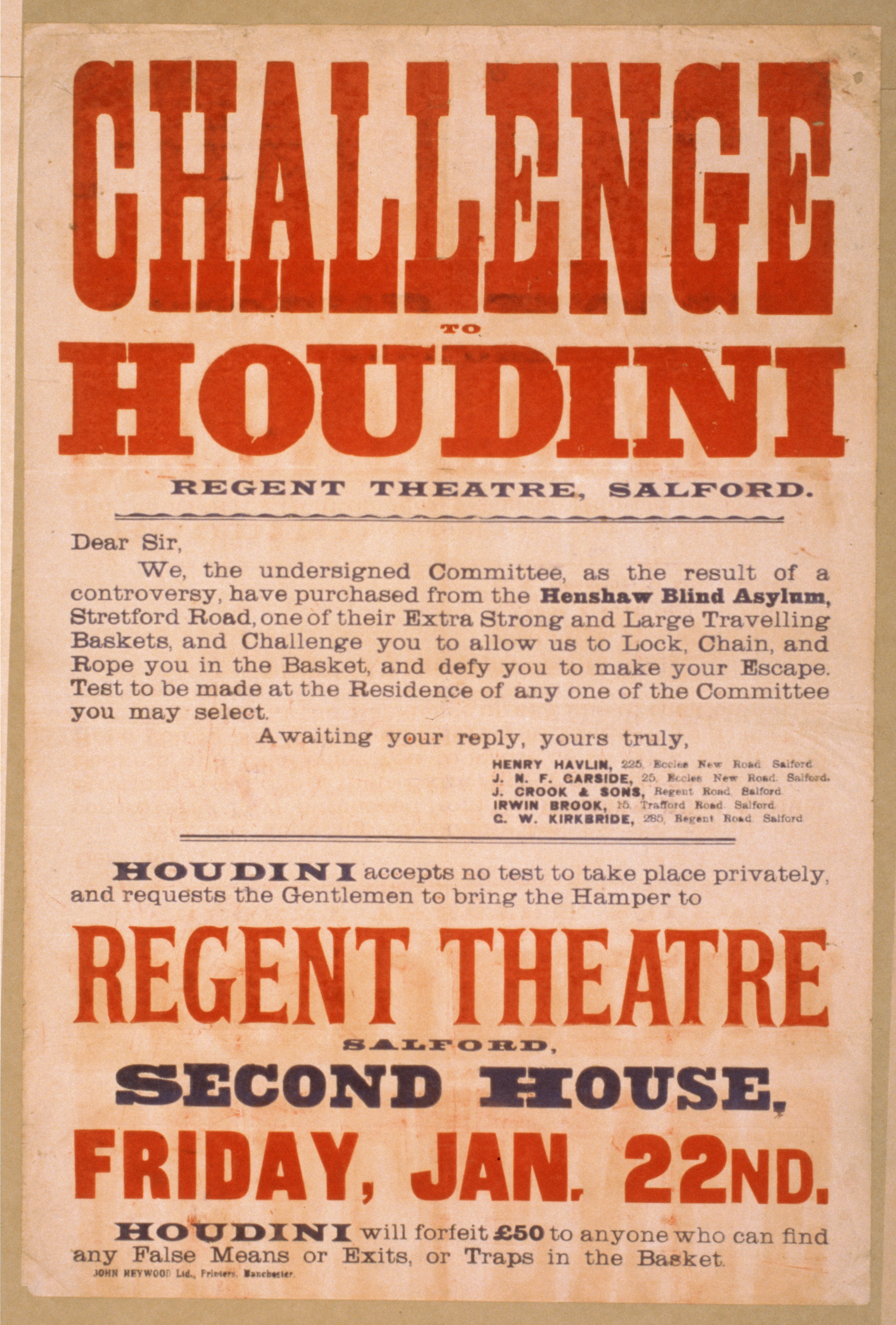
Poster promoting Houdini taking up the challenge of escaping an "extra strong and large traveling basket"

Houdini introduced the Chinese Water Torture Cell at the Circus Busch in Berlin, Germany, on September 21, 1912. He was suspended upside-down in a locked glass-and-steel cabinet full to overflowing with water, holding his breath for more than three minutes. He would go on performing this escape for the rest of his life.

During his career, Houdini explained some of his tricks in books written for the magic brotherhood. In Handcuff Secrets (1909), he revealed how many locks and handcuffs could be opened with properly applied force, others with shoestrings. Other times, he carried concealed lockpicks or keys. When tied down in ropes or straitjackets, he gained wiggle room by enlarging his shoulders and chest, moving his arms slightly away from his body.

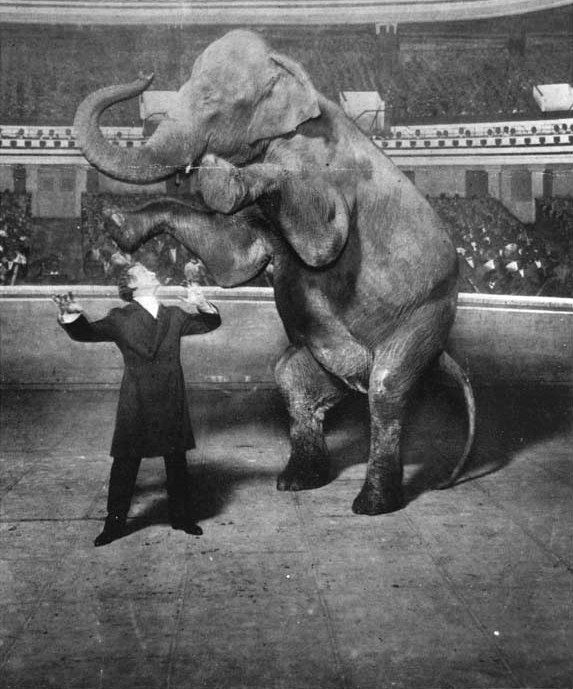
Houdini and Jennie, the Vanishing Elephant, January 7, 1918

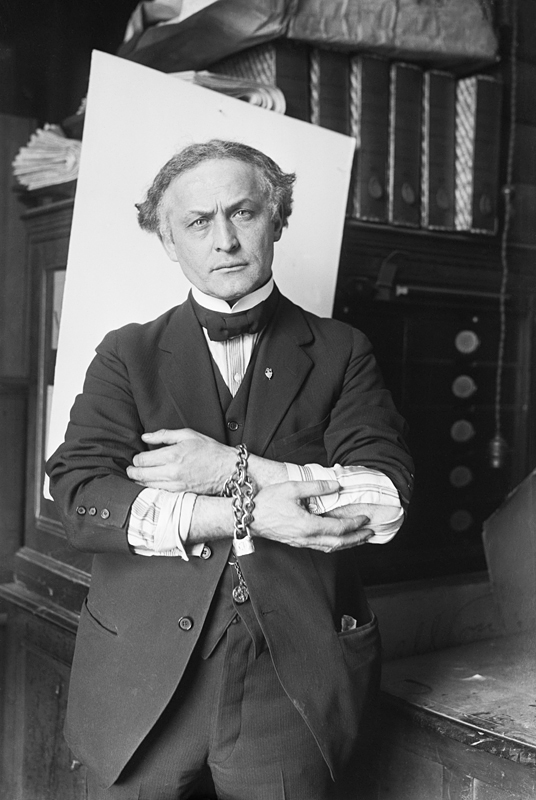
Houdini in handcuffs, 1918

His straitjacket escape was originally performed behind curtains, with him popping out free at the end. Houdini's brother (who was also an escape artist, billing himself as Theodore Hardeen) discovered that audiences were more impressed when the curtains were eliminated so they could watch him struggle to get out. On more than one occasion, they both performed straitjacket escapes while dangling upside-down from the roof of a building in the same city.

For most of his career, Houdini was a headline act in vaudeville. For many years, he was the highest-paid performer in American vaudeville. One of Houdini's most notable non-escape stage illusions was performed at the New York Hippodrome, when he vanished a full-grown elephant from the stage. He had purchased this trick from the magician Charles Morritt. In 1923, Houdini became president of Martinka & Co., America's oldest magic company. The business is still in operation today.

He also served as president of the Society of American Magicians (a.k.a. S.A.M.) from 1917 until his death in 1926. Founded on May 10, 1902, in the back room of Martinka's magic shop in New York, the Society expanded under the leadership of Harry Houdini during his term as national president from 1917 to 1926. Houdini was magic's greatest visionary: He sought to create a large, unified national network of professional and amateur magicians.

Wherever he traveled, he gave a lengthy formal address to the local magic club, made speeches, and usually threw a banquet for the members at his own expense. He said "The Magicians Clubs as a rule are small: they are weak ... but if we were amalgamated into one big body the society would be stronger, and it would mean making the small clubs powerful and worthwhile. Members would find a welcome wherever they happened to be and, conversely, the safeguard of a city-to-city hotline to track exposers and other undesirables".

For most of 1916, while on his vaudeville tour, Houdini had been recruiting – at his own expense – local magic clubs to join the S.A.M. in an effort to revitalize what he felt was a weak organization. Houdini persuaded groups in Buffalo, Detroit, Pittsburgh, and Kansas City to join. As had happened in London, he persuaded magicians to join. The Buffalo club joined as the first branch, (later assembly) of the Society. Chicago Assembly No. 3 was, as the name implies, the third regional club to be established by the S.A.M., whose assemblies now number in the hundreds.

In 1917, he signed Assembly Number Three's charter into existence; that charter and this club continue to provide Chicago magicians with a connection to each other and to their past. Houdini dined with, addressed, and got pledges from similar clubs in Detroit, Rochester, Pittsburgh, Kansas City, Cincinnati and elsewhere – the biggest movement ever in the history of magic. In places where no clubs existed, he rounded up individual magicians, introduced them to each other, and urged them into the fold.

By the end of 1916, magicians' clubs in San Francisco and other cities that Houdini had not visited were offering to become assemblies. He had created the richest and longest-surviving organization of magicians in the world. Currently, it embraces almost 6,000 dues-paying members and almost 300 assemblies worldwide. In July 1926, Houdini was elected President of the Society of American Magicians for the ninth successive time (every other president served for only one year). He was also President of the Magicians' Club of London.

In the final years of his life (1925/26), Houdini launched his own full-evening show, which he billed as "Three Shows in One: Magic, Escapes, and Fraud Mediums Exposed".

== Notable escapes ==
=== Daily Mirror challenge ===
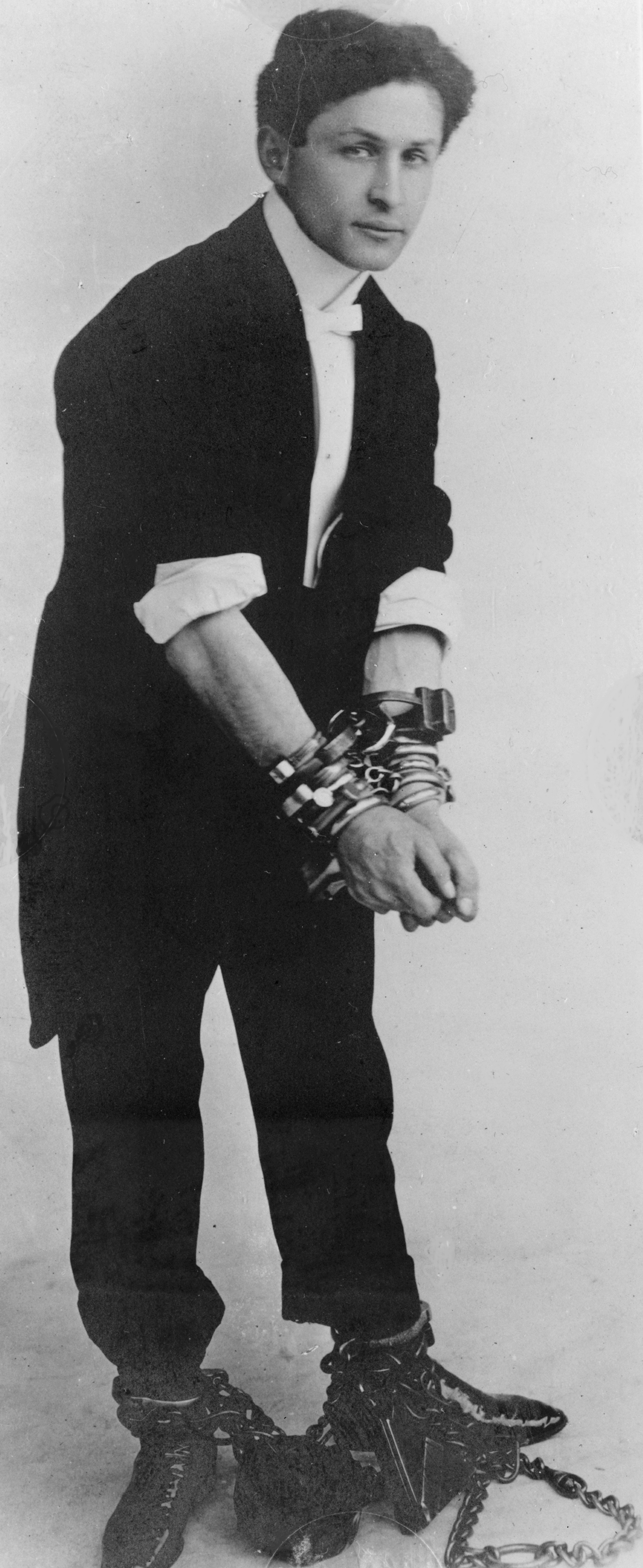
"Handcuff" Harry Houdini, c. 1905

In 1904, the London Daily Mirror newspaper challenged Houdini to escape from special handcuffs that it claimed had taken Nathaniel Hart, a locksmith from Birmingham, five years to make. Houdini accepted the challenge for March 17 during a matinée performance at London's Hippodrome theatre. It was reported that 4,000 people and more than 100 journalists turned out for the much-hyped event.

The escape attempt dragged on for over an hour, during which Houdini emerged from his "ghost house" (a small screen used to conceal the method of his escape) several times. At one point he asked if the cuffs could be removed so he could take off his coat. The Mirror representative, Frank Parker, refused, saying Houdini could gain an advantage if he saw how the cuffs were unlocked. Houdini promptly took out a penknife and, holding it in his teeth, used it to cut his coat from his body.

Some 56 minutes later, Houdini's wife appeared on stage and gave him a kiss. Many thought that the handcuff key was in Bess's mouth. However, it has since been suggested that Bess did not go onstage at all, and that this theory is unlikely because the key was six inches long. Houdini then went back behind the curtain. After an hour and ten minutes, Houdini emerged free. As he was paraded on the shoulders of the cheering crowd, he broke down and wept. At the time, Houdini said it had been one of the most difficult escapes of his career.

After Houdini's death, his friend Martin Beck was quoted in Will Goldston's book, Sensational Tales of Mystery Men, admitting that Houdini was bested that day and had appealed to Bess for help. Goldston claimed that Bess begged the key from the Mirror representative, then slipped it to Houdini in a glass of water. However, in The Secret Life of Houdini, it was confirmed that the six-inch-long key could not have been smuggled this way. Goldston offered no proof of his account.

Many modern biographers have found evidence (notably in the custom handcuff design) that the Mirror challenge may have been arranged by Houdini and that his long struggle to escape was pure showmanship. James Randi believes the only way the handcuffs could have been opened was by using their key, and speculates that it would have been viewed as "distasteful" to the Mirror and to Houdini if Houdini had failed to escape. This escape was discussed in depth on the Travel Channel's Mysteries at the Museum in an interview with Houdini expert, magician and escape artist Dorothy Dietrich of Scranton's Houdini Museum.

A full-sized construction of the same Mirror Handcuffs, as well as a replica of the Bramah style key for them, are on display to the public at The Houdini Museum in Scranton, Pennsylvania. This set of cuffs is believed to be one of only six in the world, some of which are not on display.

=== Milk Can Escape ===
In 1908, Houdini introduced his own original act, the Milk Can Escape. In this act, Houdini was handcuffed and sealed inside an oversized milk can filled with water and made his escape behind a curtain. As part of the effect, Houdini invited members of the audience to hold their breath along with him while he was inside the can. Advertised with dramatic posters that proclaimed "Failure Means A Drowning Death", the escape proved to be a sensation. Houdini soon modified the escape to include the milk can being locked inside a wooden chest, being chained or padlocked. Houdini performed the milk can escape as a regular part of his act for only four years, but it has remained one of the acts most associated with him. Houdini's brother, Theodore Hardeen, continued to perform the milk can escape and its wooden chest variant into the 1940s.

The American Museum of Magic has the milk can and overboard box used by Houdini.

After other magicians proposed variations on the Milk Can Escape Houdini claimed that the act was protected by copyright and in 1906 brought a case against John Clempert, one of the most persistent imitators. The matter was settled out of court and Clempert agreed to publish an apology.

=== Chinese Water Torture Cell ===
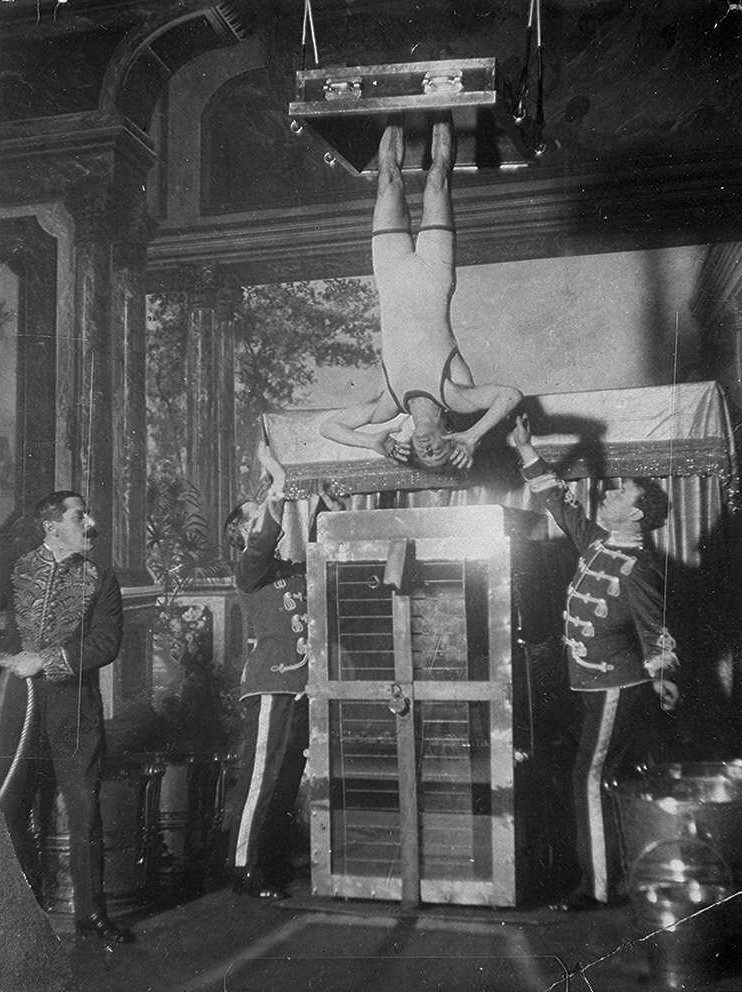
Houdini performing the Chinese Water Torture Cell

Around 1912, the vast number of imitators prompted Houdini to replace his milk can act with the Chinese Water Torture Cell. In this escape, Houdini's feet were locked in stocks, and he was lowered upside down into a tank filled with water. The mahogany and metal cell featured a glass front, through which audiences could clearly see Houdini. The stocks were locked to the top of the cell, and a curtain concealed his escape. In the earliest version of the torture cell, a metal cage was lowered into the cell, and Houdini was enclosed inside that. While making the escape more difficult – the cage prevented Houdini from turning – the cage bars also offered protection should the glass front break.

The original cell was built in England, where Houdini first performed the escape for an audience of one person as part of a one-act play he called "Houdini Upside Down". This was done to obtain copyright protection for the effect and establish grounds to sue imitators – which he did. While the escape was advertised as "The Chinese Water Torture Cell" or "The Water Torture Cell", Houdini always referred to it as "the Upside Down" or "USD". The first public performance of the USD was at the Circus Busch in Berlin, on September 21, 1912. Houdini continued to perform the escape until his death in 1926.

=== Suspended straitjacket escape ===
One of Houdini's most popular publicity stunts was to have himself strapped into a regulation straitjacket and suspended by his ankles from a tall building or crane. Houdini would then make his escape in full view of the assembled crowd. In many cases, Houdini drew tens of thousands of onlookers who brought city traffic to a halt. Houdini would sometimes ensure press coverage by performing the escape from the office building of a local newspaper. In New York City, Houdini performed the suspended straitjacket escape from a crane being used to build the subway. After flinging his body in the air, he escaped from the straitjacket. Starting from when he was hoisted up in the air by the crane, to when the straitjacket was completely off, it took him two minutes and thirty-seven seconds. There is film footage in the Library of Congress of Houdini performing the escape. Films of his escapes are also shown at The Houdini Museum in Scranton, Pennsylvania.

After being battered against a building in high winds during one escape, Houdini performed the escape with a visible safety wire on his ankle so that he could be pulled away from the building if necessary. The idea for the upside-down escape was given to Houdini by a young boy named Randolph Osborne Douglas (March 31, 1895 – December 5, 1956), when the two met at a performance at Sheffield's Empire Theatre.

=== Overboard box escape ===
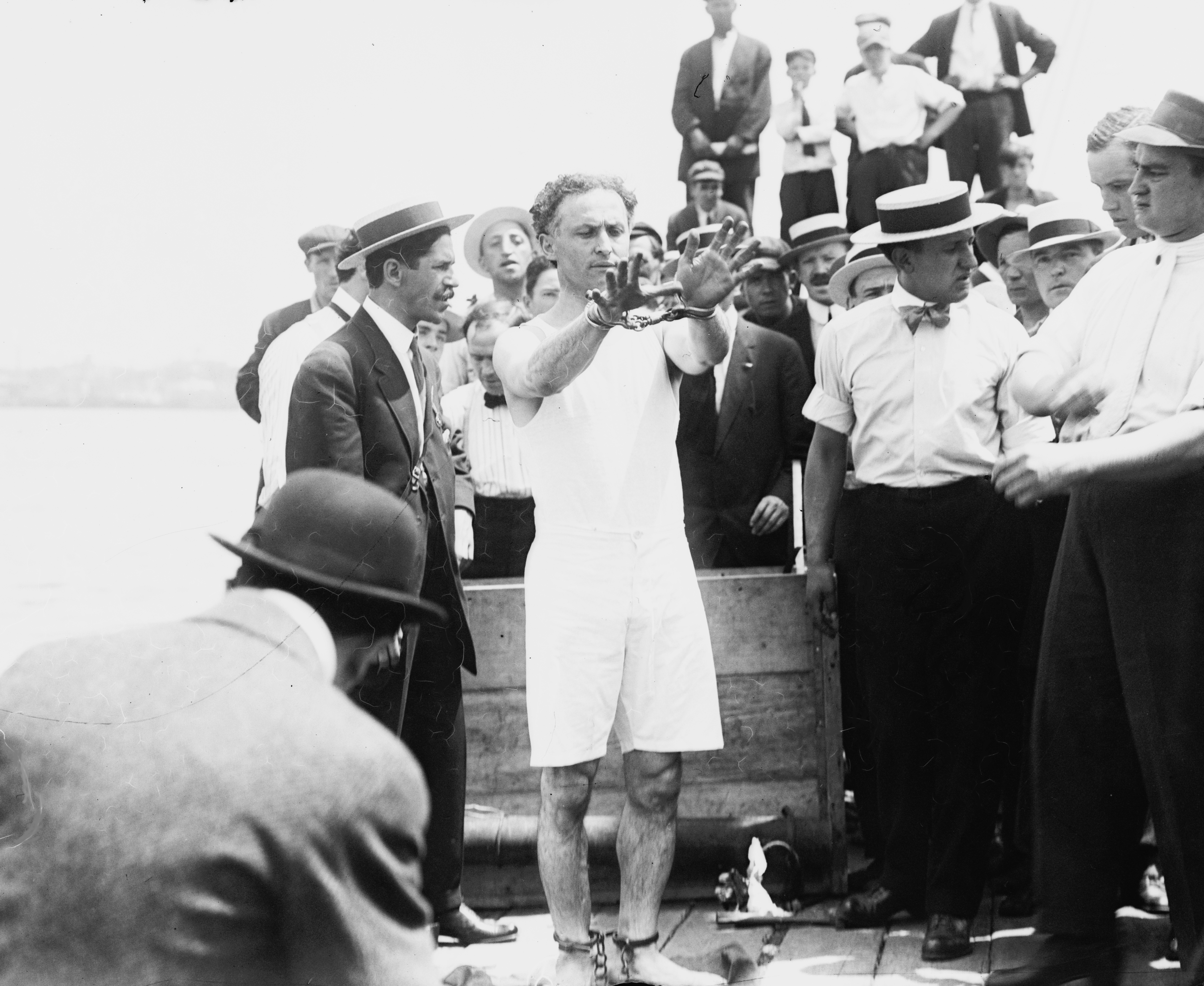
Houdini prepares to do the overboard box escape c. 1912.

Another of Houdini's most famous publicity stunts was to escape from a nailed and roped packing crate after it had been lowered into water. He first performed the escape in New York's East River on July 7, 1912. Police forbade him from using one of the piers, so he hired a tugboat and invited press on board. Houdini was locked in handcuffs and leg-irons, then nailed into the crate which was roped and weighed down with two hundred pounds of lead. The crate was then lowered into the water. He escaped in 57 seconds. The crate was pulled to the surface and found still to be intact, with the manacles inside.

Houdini performed this escape many times, and even performed a version on stage, first at Hamerstein's Roof Garden where a 5,500-US-gallon (21,000 L) tank was specially built, and later at the New York Hippodrome.

=== Buried alive stunt ===
Houdini performed at least three variations on a buried alive stunt during his career. The first was near Santa Ana, California, in 1915 and almost cost him his life. Houdini was buried without a casket in a pit of earth six feet deep. He became exhausted and panicked while trying to dig his way to the surface and called for help. When his hand finally broke the surface, he fell unconscious and had to be pulled from the grave by his assistants. Houdini wrote in his diary that the escape was "very dangerous" and that "the weight of the earth is killing".

Houdini's second variation on the buried alive stunt was an endurance test designed to expose mystical Egyptian performer Rahman Bey, who had claimed to use supernatural powers to remain in a sealed casket for an hour. Houdini bettered Bey on August 5, 1926, by remaining in a sealed casket or coffin submerged in the swimming pool of New York's Hotel Shelton for an hour and a half. Houdini claimed he did not use trickery or supernatural powers to accomplish this feat, just controlled breathing. He repeated the feat at the YMCA in Worcester, Massachusetts, on September 28, 1926, this time remaining sealed for one hour and eleven minutes.

Houdini's final buried-alive feat was an elaborate stage escape that featured in his full-evening show. Houdini would escape after being strapped in a straitjacket, sealed in a casket then buried in a large sand-filled tank. While posters advertising the escape exist (playing off the Bey challenge by boasting "Egyptian Fakirs Outdone!"), it is unclear whether Houdini ever performed the buried-alive stunt on stage. The stunt was to be the feature escape of his 1927 season, but Houdini died October 31, 1926. The bronze casket Houdini created for this stunt was used to transport his body from Detroit to New York following his death on Halloween.

== Film career ==
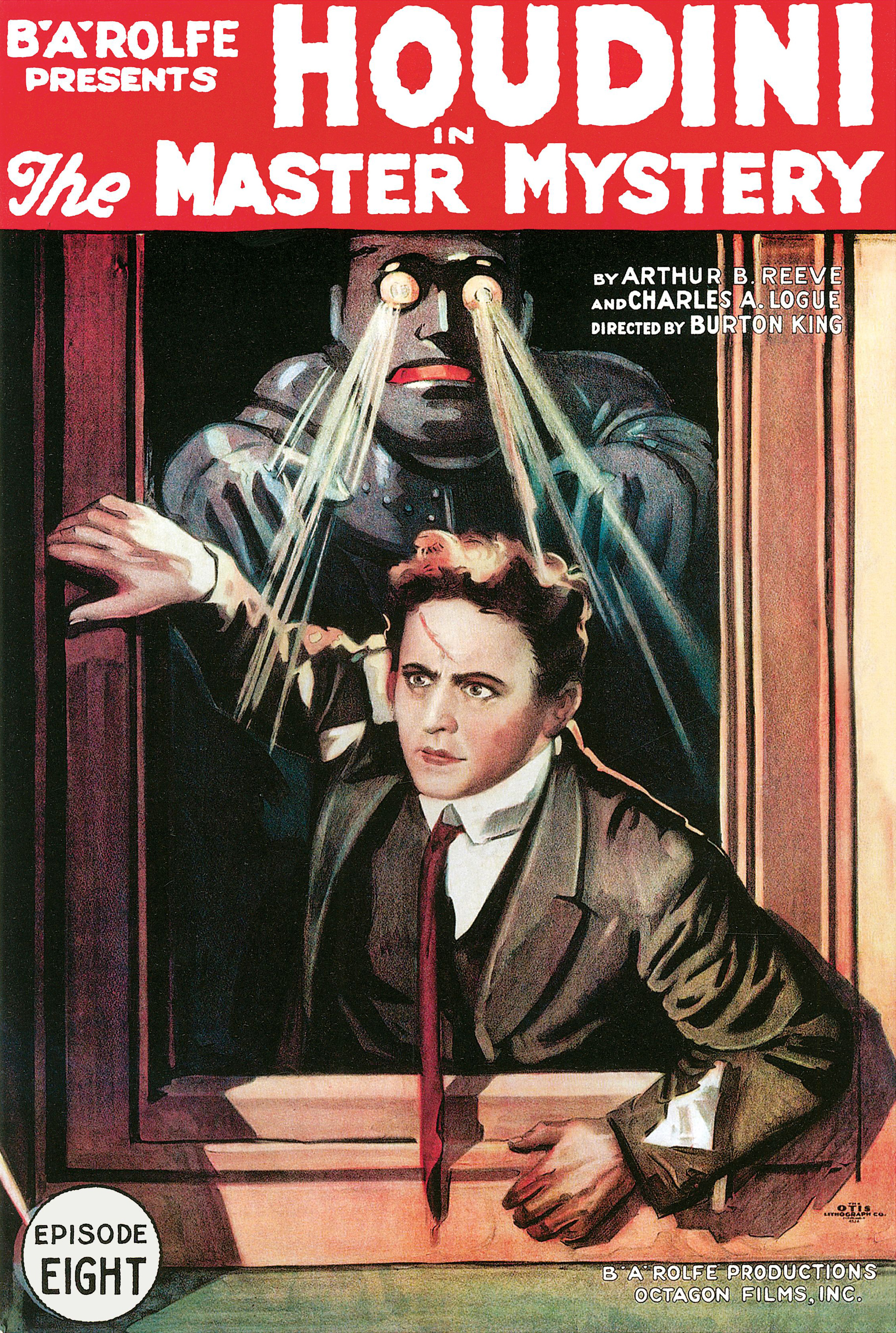
The Houdini Serial, 1919 movie poster

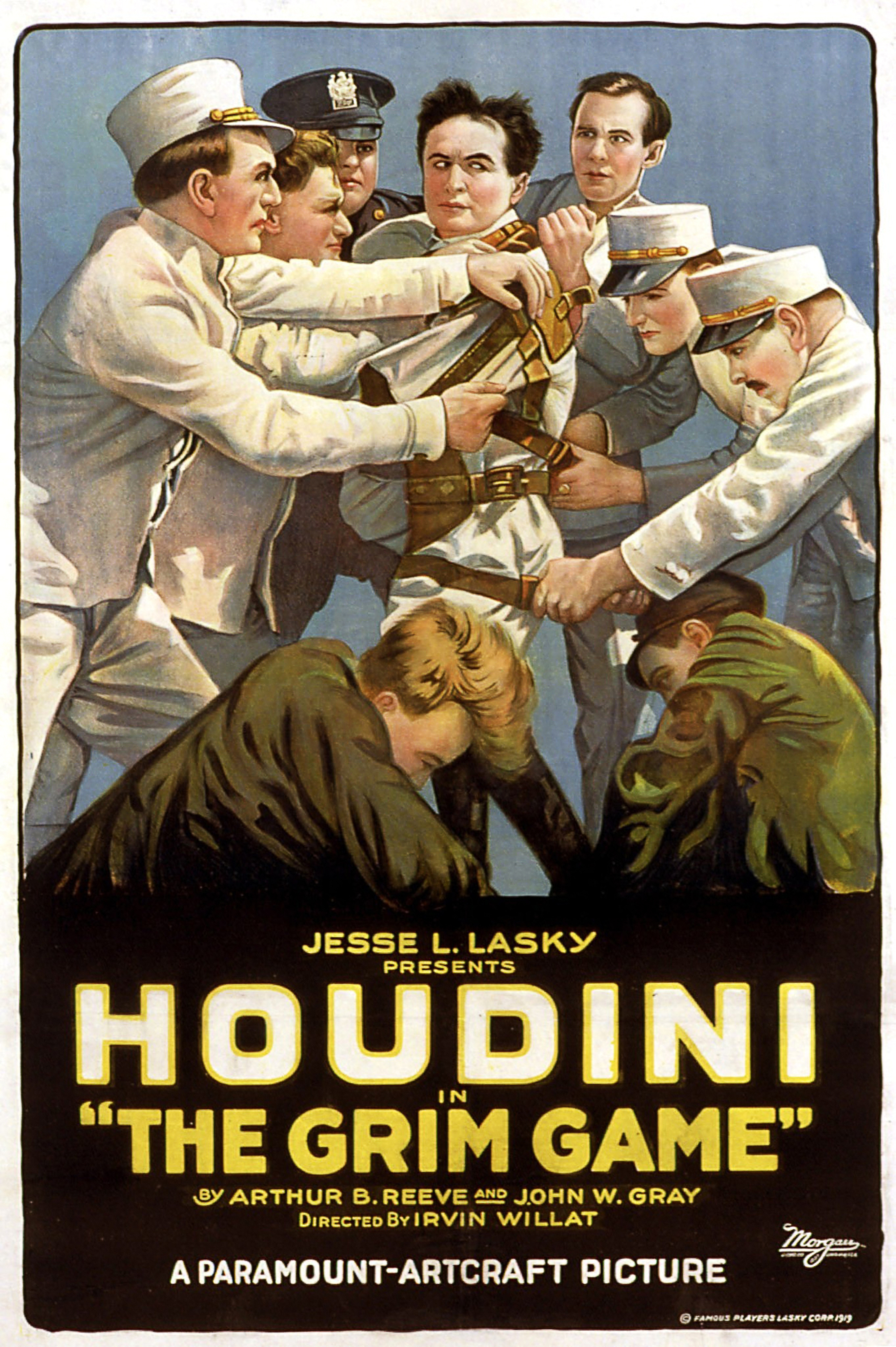
The Grim Game, 1919 movie poster

Silent movie The Master Mystery (1919). Running time: 09:39. Episode of a serial in fifteen episodes with magician and escape artist Houdini in the lead

In 1906, Houdini started showing films of his outside escapes as part of his vaudeville act. In Boston, he presented a short film called Houdini Defeats Hackenschmidt. Georg Hackenschmidt was a famous wrestler of the day, but the nature of their contest is unknown as the film is lost. In 1909, Houdini made a film in Paris for Cinema Lux titled Merveilleux Exploits du Célèbre Houdini à Paris (Marvellous Exploits of the Famous Houdini in Paris). It featured a loose narrative designed to showcase several of Houdini's famous escapes, including his straitjacket and underwater handcuff escapes. That same year Houdini got an offer to star as Captain Nemo in a silent version of Twenty Thousand Leagues Under the Seas, but the project never made it into production.

It is often erroneously reported that Houdini served as special-effects consultant on the Wharton/International cliffhanger serial The Mysteries of Myra, shot in Ithaca, New York, because Harry Grossman, director of The Master Mystery also filmed a serial in Ithaca at about the same time. The consultants on the serial were pioneering Hereward Carrington and Aleister Crowley.

In 1918, Houdini signed a contract with film producer B. A. Rolfe to star in a 15-part serial, The Master Mystery (released in November 1918). As was common at the time, the film serial was released simultaneously with a novel. Financial difficulties resulted in B. A. Rolfe Productions going out of business, but The Master Mystery led to Houdini being signed by Famous Players–Lasky Corporation/Paramount Pictures, for whom he made two pictures, The Grim Game (1919) and Terror Island (1920).

The Grim Game was Houdini's first full-length movie and is reputed to be his best. Because of the flammable nature of nitrate film and their low rate of survival, film historians considered the film lost. One copy did exist hidden in the collection of a private collector only known to a tiny group of magicians that saw it. Dick Brookz and Dorothy Dietrich of The Houdini Museum in Scranton, Pennsylvania, had seen it twice on the invitation of the collector. After many years of trying, they finally got him to agree to sell the film to Turner Classic Movies, who restored the complete 71-minute film. The film, not seen by the general public for 96 years, was shown by TCM on March 29, 2015, as a highlight of their yearly 4-day festival in Hollywood.

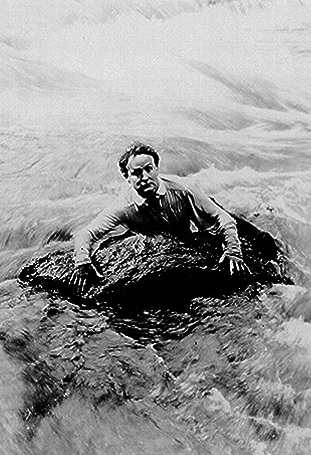
Houdini swims above Niagara Falls in a scene from The Man from Beyond (1922).

While filming an aerial stunt for The Grim Game, two biplanes collided in mid-air with a stuntman doubling Houdini dangling by a rope from one of the planes. Publicity was geared heavily toward promoting this dramatic "caught-on-film" moment, claiming it was Houdini himself dangling from the plane. While filming these movies in Los Angeles, Houdini rented a home in Laurel Canyon. Following his two-picture stint in Hollywood, Houdini returned to New York and started his own film production company called the "Houdini Picture Corporation". He produced and starred in two films, The Man from Beyond (1921) and Haldane of the Secret Service (1923). He also founded his own film laboratory business called The Film Development Corporation (FDC), gambling on a new process for developing motion picture film. Houdini's brother, Theodore Hardeen, left his own career as a magician and escape artist to run the company. Magician Harry Kellar was a major investor. In 1919 Houdini moved to Los Angeles to film. He resided in 2435 Laurel Canyon Boulevard, a residence owned by Ralph M. Walker. The Houdini Estate, a tribute to Houdini, is located on 2400 Laurel Canyon Boulevard, previously home to Walker himself. The Houdini Estate is subject to controversy, in that it is disputed whether Houdini ever actually made it his home. While there are claims it was Houdini's house, others counter that "he never set foot" on the property. It is rooted in Bess's parties or seances, etc. held across the street, she would do so at the Walker mansion. In fact, the guesthouse featured an elevator connecting to a tunnel that crossed under Laurel Canyon to the big house grounds (though capped, the tunnel still exists).

Neither Houdini's acting career nor FDC found success, and he gave up on the movie business in 1923, complaining that "the profits are too meager".

In April 2008, Kino International released a DVD box set of Houdini's surviving silent films, including The Master Mystery, Terror Island, The Man From Beyond, Haldane of the Secret Service, and five minutes from The Grim Game. The set also includes newsreel footage of Houdini's escapes from 1907 to 1923, and a section from Merveilleux Exploits du Célébre Houdini à Paris, although it is not identified as such.

== Aviator ==
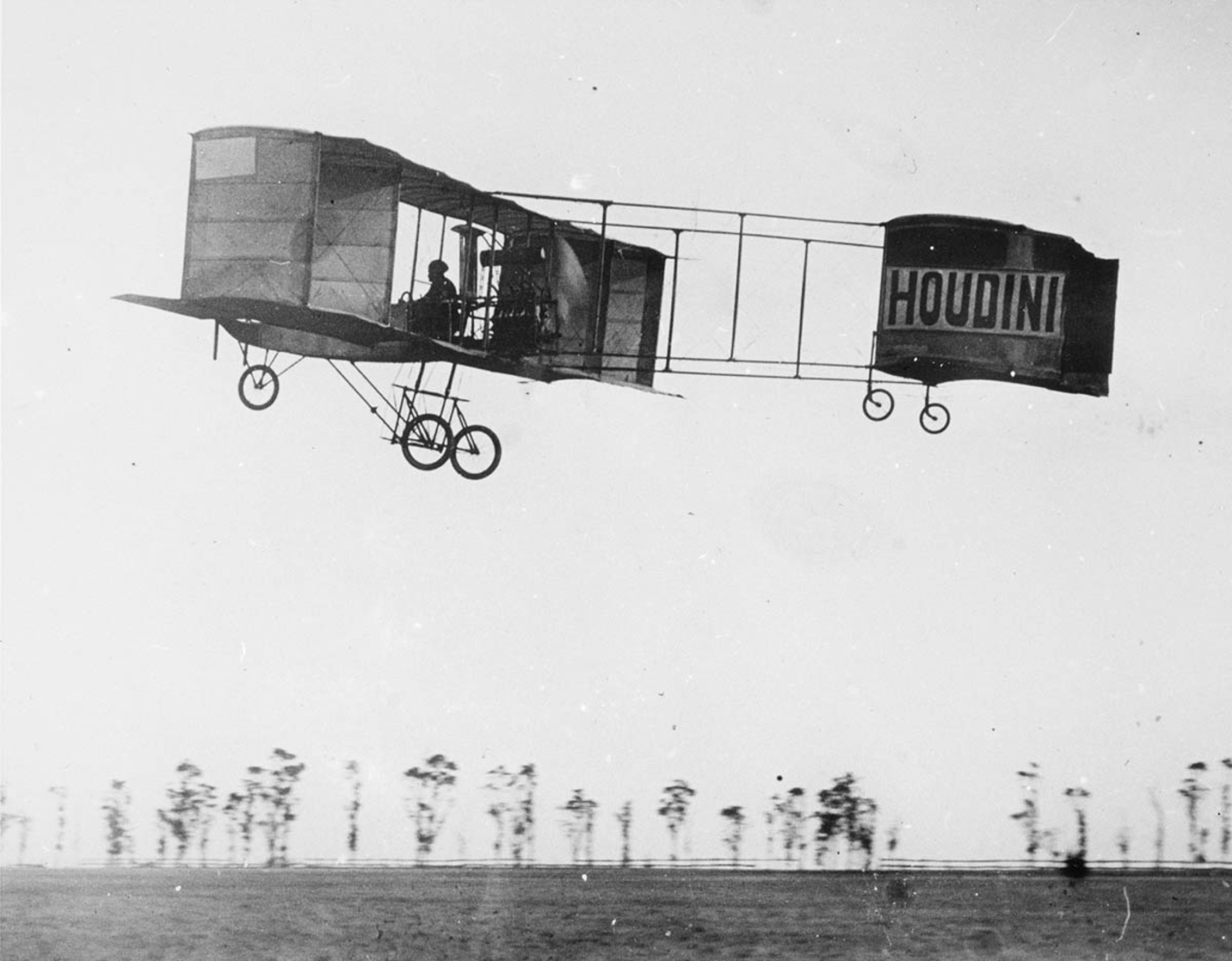
Houdini in his Voisin, 1910

In 1909, Houdini became fascinated with aviation. He purchased a French Voisin biplane for $5,000 (equivalent to $172,768 in 2025) from the Chilean aviators José Luis Sánchez-Besa and Emilio Eduardo Bello, and hired a full-time mechanic, Antonio Brassac. After crashing once, he made his first successful flight on November 26 in Hamburg, Germany.

The following year, Houdini toured Australia and brought along his Voisin biplane with the intention to be the first person to fly in Australia.

Melbourne people will shortly have an opportunity of witnessing the ascent of a flying machine, for Houdini, whose Voisin bi-plane has arrived, has determined to make a flight before his season closes at the [New] Opera House [in Melbourne, at the end of March]. The 60 to 80 horse-power motor used is of the E.N.V. pattern. The machine has been erected at Diggers' Rest.

=== Australian flights ===
==== March 18, 1910 ====
On Friday, March 18, 1910, following more than a month of delays due to inclement weather conditions, Houdini completed one of the first powered aeroplane flights ever made in Australia. He made three flights in his Voisin biplane, at the Old Plumpton Paddock at Diggers Rest, Victoria, ranging from 1 minute to 3½ minutes – reaching an altitude of 100 ft in one of his flights, and travelling more than two miles in another. Nine of the 30 spectators present on that day signed a certificate verifying Houdini's achievement.

==== March 20, 1910 ====
Hampered by the windy conditions on the Saturday, and unable to fly safely, Houdini took to the air again early on Sunday morning, 20 March 1910. After a short preliminary flight, lasting 26 sec., Houdini took wing again, and, applauded by hundred or more spectators, flew three circles at altitudes varying from 20ft to over 100ft, covering a distance of between three and four miles in 3min 45½sec. The Argus, 21 March 1910.

==== March 21, 1910 ====
On Monday morning, 21 March 1910, some 30 spectators witnessed Houdini make an extended flight at Diggers Rest of 7min. 37secs., covering at least 6 miles, at altitudes ranging from 20 ft. to 100 ft. Australian aviator Basil Watson's father, mother, and younger sister, Venora, were among the spectators; and their names were included in the list of 16 spectator signatures on the certificate that verified Houdini's achievement.

=== After Australia ===
After completing his Australia tour, Houdini put the Voisin into storage in England. He announced he would use it to fly from city to city during his next music hall tour and even promised to leap from it handcuffed, but he never flew again.

== Debunking spiritualists ==
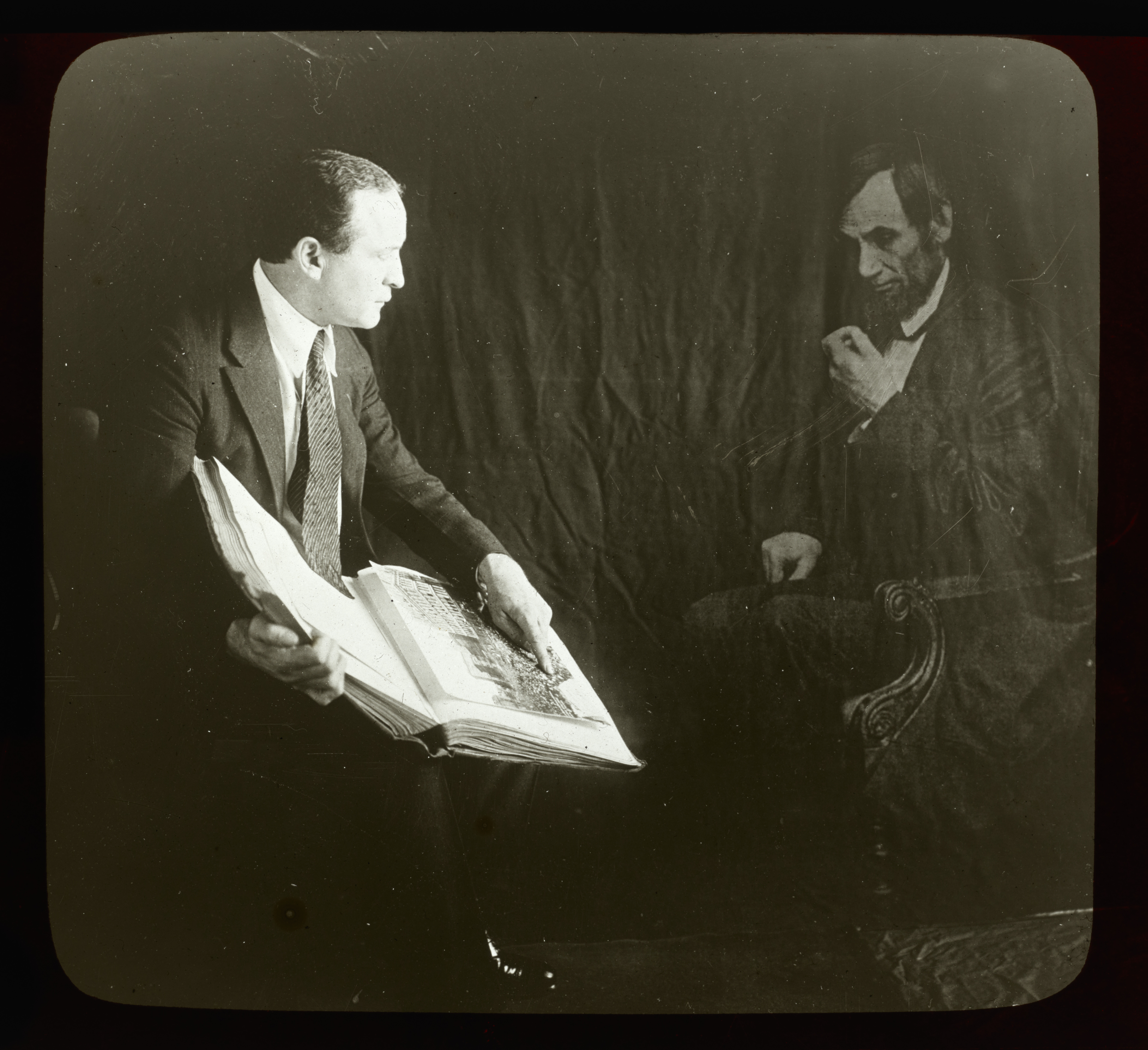
Houdini demonstrates how a photographer could produce fraudulent "spirit photographs" that purported to document the apparition and social interaction of the dead.

In the 1920s, Houdini turned his energies toward debunking psychics and mediums in order to show how they were taking advantage of the bereaved, a pursuit that was in line with the debunkings by stage magicians since the late nineteenth century.

Houdini's training in magic allowed him to expose frauds who had successfully fooled many scientists and academics. He was a member of a Scientific American committee that offered a cash prize to any medium who could successfully demonstrate supernatural abilities. None were able to do so, and the prize was never collected. The first to be tested was medium George Valiantine of Wilkes Barre, Pennsylvania. As his fame as a "medium-buster" grew, Houdini took to attending séances in disguise, accompanied by a reporter and a police officer. Possibly the most famous medium he debunked was Mina Crandon, also known as "Margery".

Joaquín Argamasilla, known as the "Spaniard with X-ray Eyes", claimed to be able to read handwriting or numbers on dice through closed metal boxes. In 1924, he was exposed by Houdini as a fraud. Argamasilla peeked through his simple blindfold and lifted up the edge of the box so he could look inside it without others noticing. Houdini also investigated the Italian medium Nino Pecoraro, whom he considered to be fraudulent.

Houdini's exposure of phony mediums inspired other magicians to follow suit, including The Amazing Randi, Dorothy Dietrich, Penn & Teller, and Dick Brookz.

Houdini chronicled his debunking exploits in his book, A Magician Among the Spirits, co-authored with C. M. Eddy, Jr., who was not credited. These activities compromised Houdini's friendship with Sir Arthur Conan Doyle. Doyle, a firm believer in spiritualism during his later years, refused to give credence to any of Houdini's exposés. Doyle came to believe that Houdini was a powerful spiritualist medium and had performed many of his stunts by means of paranormal abilities and was using those abilities to block the powers of the mediums that he was supposedly debunking. This disagreement led to the two men becoming public antagonists and Doyle came to view Houdini as a dangerous enemy.

Before Houdini died, he and his wife agreed that if Houdini found it possible to communicate after death, he would communicate the message "Rosabelle believe", a secret code which they agreed to use. "Rosabelle" was their favorite song. Bess held yearly séances on Halloween for ten years after Houdini's death. She did claim to have contact through Arthur Ford in 1929 when Ford conveyed the secret code, but Bess later said the incident had been faked. The code seems to have been such that it could be broken by Ford or his associates using existing clues. Evidence to this effect was discovered by Ford's biographer after he died in 1971. In 1936, after a last unsuccessful séance on the roof of the Knickerbocker Hotel, she put out the candle that she had kept burning beside a photograph of Houdini since his death. In 1943, Bess said that "ten years is long enough to wait for any man."

The tradition of holding a séance for Houdini continues, held by magicians throughout the world. The Official Houdini Séance was organized in the 1940s by Sidney Hollis Radner, a Houdini aficionado from Holyoke, Massachusetts. Yearly Houdini séances are also conducted in Chicago at the Excalibur nightclub by "necromancer" Neil Tobin on behalf of the Chicago Assembly of the Society of American Magicians; and at the Houdini Museum in Scranton by magician Dorothy Dietrich, who previously held them at New York's Magic Towne House with such magical notables as Houdini biographers Walter B. Gibson and Milbourne Christopher. Gibson was asked by Bess Houdini to carry on the original séance tradition. After doing them for many years at New York's Magic Towne House, before he died, Walter passed on the tradition of conducting of the Original Séances to Dorothy Dietrich.

In 1926, Harry Houdini hired H. P. Lovecraft and his friend C. M. Eddy, Jr., to write an entire book about the origin, history, and fallacy of primitive, pre-scientific, and superstitious beliefs, which was to be called The Cancer of Superstition. Houdini had earlier asked Lovecraft to write an article about astrology, for which he paid $75 (equivalent to $1,364 in 2025). The article does not survive. Lovecraft's detailed synopsis for Cancer does survive, as do three chapters of the treatise written by Eddy. Houdini's death derailed the plans, as his widow did not wish to pursue the project.

== Appearance and voice recordings ==
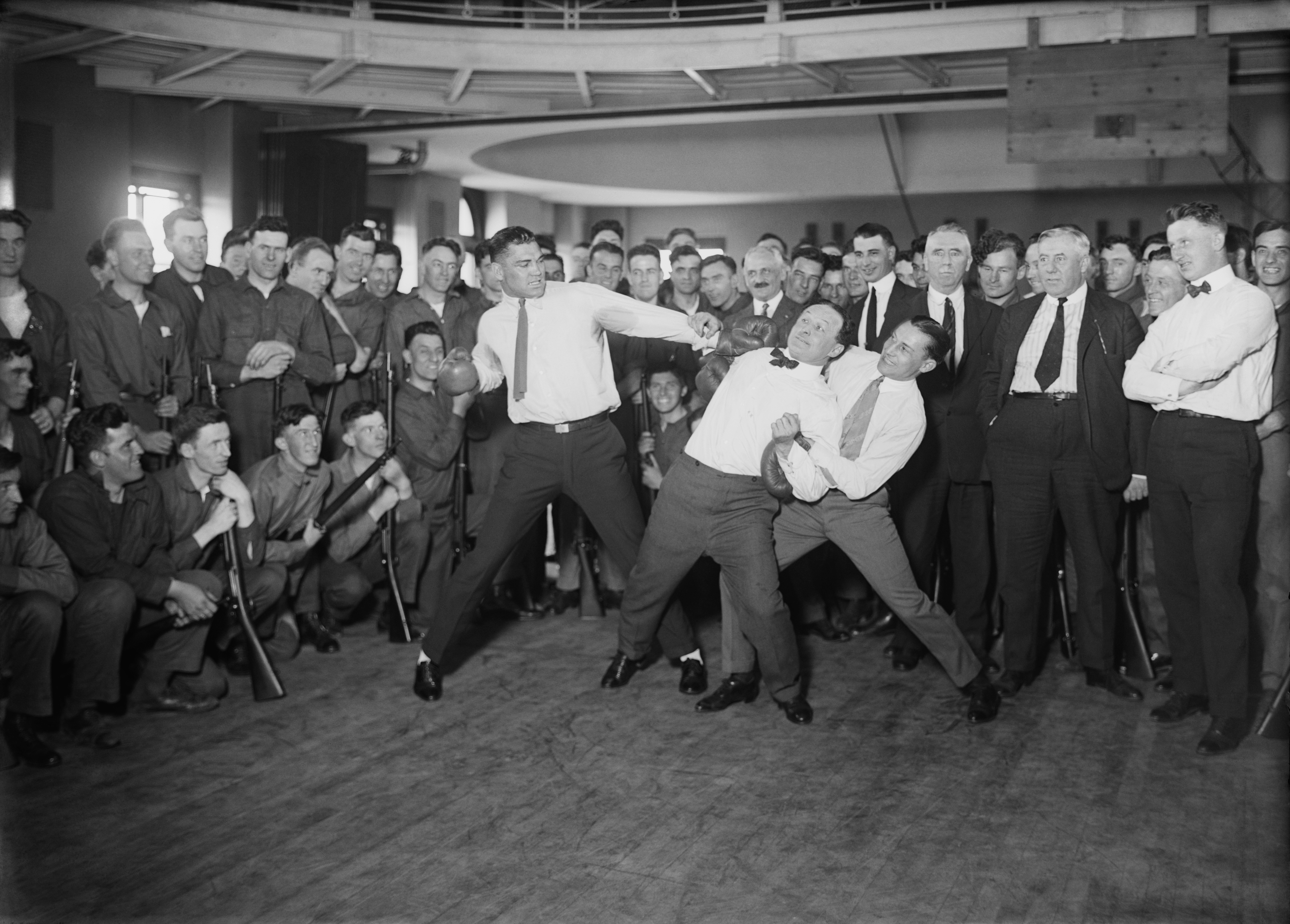
Heavyweight boxer Jack Dempsey mock-punching Houdini (held back by lightweight boxer Benny Leonard)

Unlike the image of the classic magician, Houdini was short and stocky and typically appeared on stage in a long frock coat and tie. Most biographers give his height as 5 feet 5 inches (1.65 m), but descriptions vary. Houdini was also said to be slightly bow-legged, which aided in his ability to gain slack during his rope escapes. In the 1997 biography Houdini!!!: The Career of Ehrich Weiss, author Kenneth Silverman summarizes how reporters described Houdini's appearance during his early career:

They stressed his smallness – "somewhat undersized" – and angular, vivid features: "He is smooth-shaven with a keen, sharp-chinned, sharp-cheekboned face, bright blue eyes and thick, curly, black hair." Some sensed how much his complexly expressive smile was the outlet of his charismatic stage presence. It communicated to audiences at once warm amiability, pleasure in performing, and, more subtly, imperious self-assurance. Several reporters tried to capture the charming effect, describing him as "happy-looking", "pleasant-faced", "good natured at all times", "the young Hungarian magician with the pleasant smile and easy confidence".

Harry Houdini's voice
Recording of Harry Houdini's voice made on October 29, 1914

Houdini made the only known recordings of his voice on Edison wax cylinders on October 29, 1914, in Flatbush, New York. On them, Houdini practices several different introductory speeches for his famous Chinese Water Torture Cell. He also invites his sister, Gladys, to recite a poem. Houdini then recites the same poem in German. The six wax cylinders were discovered in the collection of magician John Mulholland after his death in 1970. They are part of the David Copperfield collection.

== Legal issues ==
In September 1900, Houdini was summoned by the German police prior to his first performance in the country who suspected his act was fake. Subsequently in Berlin, he was stripped naked and forced to perform an escape routine in front of 300 policemen. Houdini was tightly restrained with "thumbscrews, finger locks, and five different hand and elbow irons". He was able to escape in 6 minutes, and later used the stunt in advertising. Subsequently in 1901, a newspaper in Cologne accused him of attempting to bribe a police officer in order to rig an escape attempt, and paying a civilian police employee to aid him with another performance. Houdini sued the newspaper and the police officer for slander. As part of the trial, Houdini was asked to open without the aid of tools one of the police officer's handcrafted locks, for which the officer had said that Houdini had tried to bribe him. Houdini was able to do so, and won the case.

== Personal life ==
Houdini became an active Freemason and was a member of St Cecile Lodge No. 568 in New York City.

In 1904 Houdini bought a New York City townhouse at 278 West 113th Street in Harlem. He paid US$25,000 (equivalent to $895,833 in 2025) for the five-level, 6,008-square-foot house, which was built in 1895, and lived in it with his wife, Bess, and various other relatives until his death in 1926. In March 2018 it sold for $3.6 million. A plaque affixed to the building by the Historical Landmark Preservation Center reads, "The magician lived here from 1904 to 1926 collecting illusions, theatrical memorabilia, and books on psychic phenomena and magic."

In 1919 Houdini moved to Los Angeles to film. He resided at 2435 Laurel Canyon Boulevard, a house of his friend and business associate Ralph M. Walker, who owned both sides of the street, 2335 and 2400, the latter address having a pool where Houdini practised his water escapes. 2400 Laurel Canyon Boulevard, previously numbered 2398, is currently known as The Houdini Estate, thus named in honor of Houdini's time there, the same estate where Bess Houdini threw a party for 500 magicians years after his death. After decades of abandonment the estate was acquired in 2006 by José Luis Nazar, a Chilean/American citizen who has restored it to its former splendor.

In 1918, he registered for selective service as Harry Handcuff Houdini.

== Death ==
Houdini died on October 31, 1926, at the age of 52 from peritonitis, possibly related to appendicitis and possibly related to punches to his abdomen he had received about a week and a half earlier.

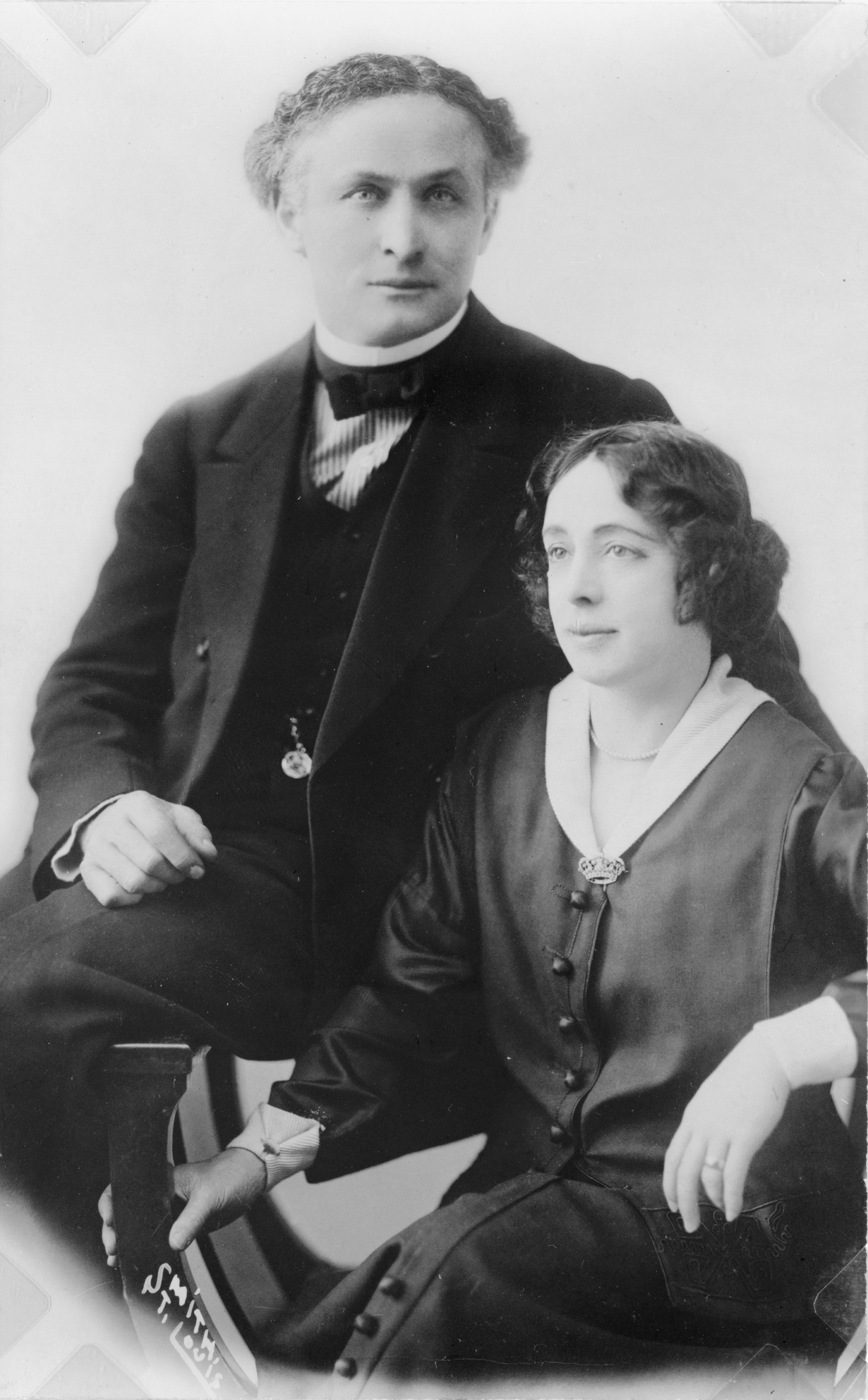
Houdini and his wife Bess

Witnesses to an incident at Houdini's dressing room in the Princess Theatre in Montreal on October 22, 1926, speculated that Houdini's death was caused by J. Gordon Whitehead, a student at McGill University, who repeatedly struck Houdini's abdomen.

The accounts of the witnesses, students named Jacques Price and Sam Smilovitz (sometimes called Jack Price and Sam Smiley), generally corroborated each other. Price said that Whitehead asked Houdini "if he believed in the miracles of the Bible" and "whether it was true that punches in the stomach did not hurt him". Houdini offered a casual reply that his stomach could endure a lot. Whitehead then delivered "some very hammer-like blows below the belt". Houdini was reclining on a couch at the time, having broken his ankle while performing several days earlier. Price said that Houdini winced at each blow and stopped Whitehead suddenly in the midst of a punch, gesturing that he had enough, and adding that he had had no opportunity to prepare himself against the blows, as he did not expect Whitehead to strike him so suddenly and forcefully. Had his ankle not been broken, he would have risen from the couch into a better position to brace himself.

Throughout the evening Houdini performed in great pain. He had insomnia and remained in constant pain for the next two days but did not seek medical help. When he finally saw a doctor he was found to have a fever of 102 °F (39 °C) and acute appendicitis and was advised to have immediate surgery. He ignored the advice and decided to go on with the show. When Houdini arrived at the Garrick Theater in Detroit, Michigan, on October 24, 1926, for what would be his last performance, he had a fever of 104 °F (40 °C). Despite the diagnosis, Houdini took the stage. He was reported to have passed out during the show but was revived and continued. Afterwards he was hospitalized at Detroit's Grace Hospital, where he died from peritonitis on October 31, aged 52.

It is unknown if the blunt trauma Houdini sustained contributed to his eventual death. Although rare, acute appendicitis following direct abdominal trauma has been observed. One theory suggests that Houdini was unaware that he was suffering from appendicitis and he might have taken his abdominal pain more seriously had he not coincidentally received blows to the abdomen. According to Adam Begley it is more likely that Houdini was suffering the effects of appendicitis prior to the punches and his reluctance to seek medical care delayed potential treatment. Retired surgeon Larrian Gillespie has argued that Houdini died of septic shock resulting from a bowel obstruction. Gillespie also speculated that Houdini died on October 30, 1926, not October 31.

After taking statements from Price and Smilovitz, Houdini's insurance company concluded that the death was due to the dressing-room incident and paid double indemnity.

== Houdini grave site ==
Houdini's funeral was held on November 4, 1926, in New York, with more than 2,000 mourners in attendance. He was interred in the Machpelah Cemetery in Glendale, Queens, with the crest of the Society of American Magicians inscribed on his grave site. A statuary bust was added to the exedra in 1927, a rarity, because graven images are forbidden in Jewish cemeteries. In 1975, the bust was destroyed by vandals. Temporary busts were placed at the grave until 2011 when a group from the Houdini Museum in Scranton, Pennsylvania, placed a permanent bust with the permission of Houdini's family and of the cemetery.

The Society of American Magicians took responsibility for the upkeep of the site, as Houdini had willed a large sum of money to the organization he had grown from one club to 5,000–6,000 dues-paying memberships worldwide. The payment of upkeep was abandoned by the society's dean George Schindler, who said "Houdini paid for perpetual care, but there's nobody at the cemetery to provide it", adding that the operator of the cemetery, David Jacobson, "sends us a bill for upkeep every year but we never pay it because he never provides any care." Members of the Society tidy the grave themselves.

Machpelah Cemetery operator Jacobson said that they "never paid the cemetery for any restoration of the Houdini family plot in my tenure since 1988", claiming that the money came from the cemetery's dwindling funds. The granite monuments of Houdini's sister, Gladys, and brother, Leopold were also destroyed by vandals. For many years, until recently, the Houdini grave site has been only cared for by Dorothy Dietrich and Dick Brookz of the Houdini Museum in Scranton, Pennsylvania. The Society of American Magicians, at its National Council Meeting in Boca Raton, Florida, in 2013, under the prompting of Dietrich and Brookz, voted to assume the financial responsibilities for the care and maintenance of the Houdini Gravesite. While the actual plot will remain under the control of Machpelah Cemetery management, the Society of American Magicians, with the help of the Houdini Museum in Pennsylvania, will be in charge of the restoration.

Houdini's widow, Bess, died of a heart attack on February 11, 1943, aged 67, in Needles, California, while on a train en route from Los Angeles to New York City. She had expressed a wish to be buried next to her husband, but instead was interred 35 miles (56 km) north at the Gate of Heaven Cemetery in Westchester County, New York, since her Catholic family refused to allow her to be buried in a Jewish cemetery.

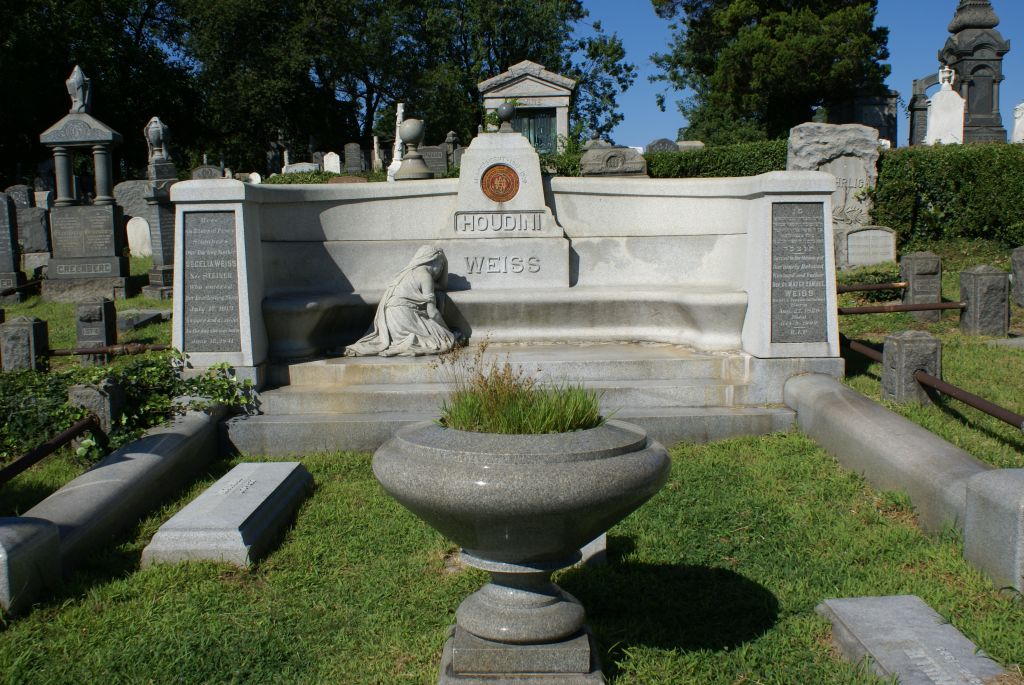
The gravesite of Harry Houdini

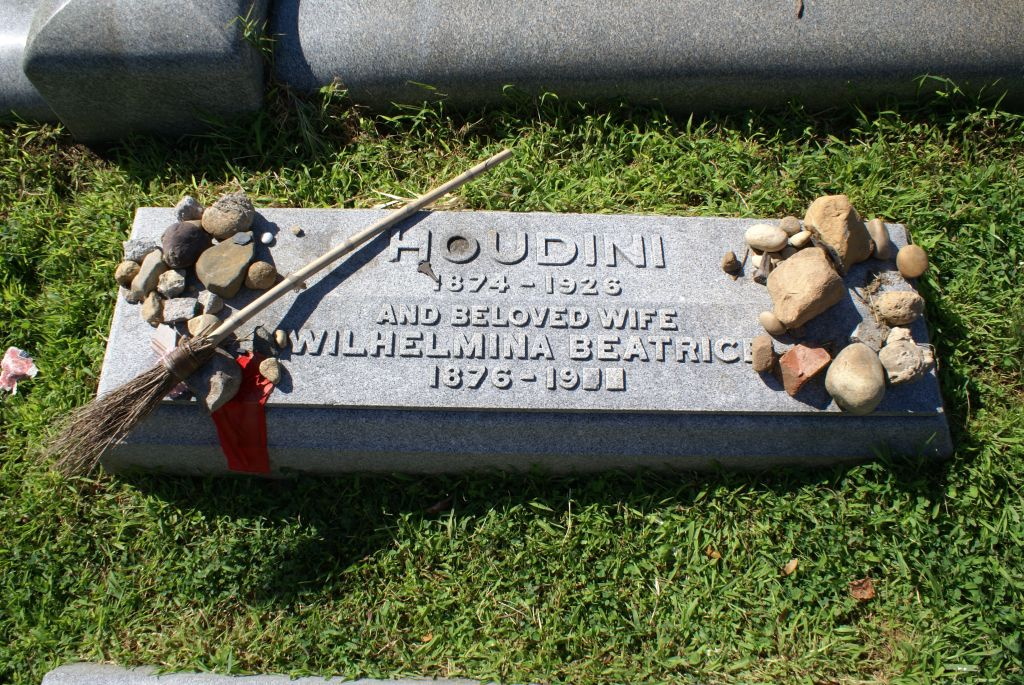
The grave marker at Harry Houdini's burial site

Weiss Family Grave Memorial Site at Machpelah Cemetery

=== Proposed exhumation ===
On March 22, 2007, Houdini's great-nephew (the grandson of his brother Theo) George Hardeen announced that the courts would be asked to allow exhumation of Houdini's body to investigate the possibility of Houdini being murdered by spiritualists, as suggested in the biography The Secret Life of Houdini. In a statement given to the Houdini Museum in Scranton, the family of Bess Houdini opposed the application and suggested it was a publicity ploy for the book. The Washington Post stated that the press conference was not arranged by the family of Houdini. Instead, the Post reported, it was orchestrated by the book's authors, William Kalush and Larry Sloman, who had hired the public-relations firm Dan Klores Communications to promote the book.

In 2008, it was revealed the parties involved had not filed legal papers to perform an exhumation.

== Legacy ==
Houdini's brother Theodore Hardeen, who returned to performing after Houdini's death, inherited his brother's effects and props. Houdini's will stipulated that all the effects should be "burned and destroyed" upon Hardeen's death. Hardeen sold much of the collection to magician and Houdini enthusiast Sidney Hollis Radner during the 1940s, including the water torture cell. Radner allowed choice pieces of the collection to be displayed at The Houdini Magical Hall of Fame in Niagara Falls, Ontario. In 1995, a fire destroyed the museum. The water torture cell's metal frame remained, and it was restored by illusion builder John Gaughan. Many of the props contained in the museum such as the mirror handcuffs, Houdini's original packing crate, a milk can, and a straitjacket, survived the fire and were auctioned in 1999 and 2008.

Radner lent the bulk of his collection for archiving to the Outagamie Museum in Appleton, Wisconsin, but reclaimed it in 2003 and auctioned it in Las Vegas, on October 30, 2004.

Houdini was a "formidable collector" and bequeathed many of his holdings and paper archives on magic and spiritualism to the Library of Congress, which became the basis for the Houdini collection in cyberspace. Houdini's book collecting has been explored in an essay in The Book Collector.

In 1934 the bulk of Houdini's collection of American and British theatrical material, along with a significant portion of his business and personal papers, and some of his collections of other magicians were sold to pay off estate debts to theatre magnate Messmore Kendall. In 1958 Kendall presented his collection to the Hoblitzelle Theatre Library at the University of Texas at Austin. In the 1960s, the Hoblitzelle Library became part of the Harry Ransom Center. The extensive Houdini collection includes a 1584 first edition of Reginald Scot's Discoverie of Witchcraft and David Garrick's travel diary to Paris from 1751. Some of the scrapbooks in the Houdini collection have been digitized. The collection was exclusively paper-based until April 2016, when the Ransom Center acquired one of Houdini's ball weights with chain and ankle cuff. In October 2016, in conjunction with the 90th anniversary of the death of Houdini, the Ransom Center embarked on a major re-cataloging of the Houdini collection to make it more visible and accessible to researchers. The collection reopened in 2018, with its finding aids posted online.

A large portion of Houdini's estate holdings and memorabilia was willed to his fellow magician and friend John Mulholland. In 1991, illusionist and television performer David Copperfield purchased all of Mulholland's Houdini holdings from Mulholland's estate. These are now archived and preserved in Copperfield's warehouse at his headquarters in Las Vegas. It contains the world's largest collection of Houdini memorabilia and preserves approximately 80,000 items of memorabilia of Houdini and other magicians, including Houdini's stage props and material, his rebuilt water torture cabinet and his metamorphosis trunk. It is not open to the public, with access generally limited to invited guests such as fellow magicians and serious collectors.

In a posthumous ceremony on October 31, 1975, Houdini was given a star on the Hollywood Walk of Fame at 7001 Hollywood Blvd.

The Houdini Museum in Scranton, Pennsylvania, bills itself as "the only building in the world entirely dedicated to Houdini". It is open to the public year-round by reservation. It includes Houdini films, a guided tour about Houdini's life and a stage magic show. Magicians Dorothy Dietrich and Dick Brookz opened the facility in 1991. The House of Houdini is a museum and performance venue located at 11, Dísz square in the Buda Castle in Budapest, Hungary. It claims to house the largest collection of original Houdini artifacts in Europe. The Houdini Museum of New York is located at Fantasma Magic, a retail magic manufacturer and seller located in Manhattan. The museum contains several hundred pieces of ephemera, most of which belonged to Harry Houdini.

== Cultural depictions of Houdini ==
There have been many depictions, references, homages and tributes in popular media, with some taking liberties with biographical accuracy.

=== Television ===
- In 1976 ABC broadcast a television film called The Great Houdinis, starring Paul Michael Glaser as Harry and Sally Struthers as Bess Houdini. It also featured Ruth Gordon as Houdini's mother, Cecilia Weiss, and Vivian Vance as Minnie, Bess's nurse (as well as the narrator).
- A 1998 telefilm biopic, Houdini, aired on TNT, starring Johnathon Schaech as adult Harry Houdini and Emile Hirsch as young Houdini, a.k.a. Erik Weisz. It also starred Grace Zabriskie as Cecilia; Mark Ruffalo as his brother, Theodore Hardeen; Stacy Edwards as his eventual wife, Bess; and David Warner as Sir Arthur Conan Doyle.
- In 2014 the History Channel premiered a two-parter miniseries biopic, Houdini, about his life. Adrien Brody starred as Houdini, while Kristen Connolly portrayed Bess and Evan Jones played one of his magician's assistants, Jim Collins.
- A 2016 TV series, Houdini & Doyle, concentrated on the real-life friendship between Houdini and Doyle, author of the Sherlock Holmes detective literature series. Michael Weston portrayed Houdini and Stephen Mangan portrayed Doyle. The series was cancelled after one season.
- In 2019, the Italian illusionist Marc Casellato produced, directed, and presented the docu-series ("The Other Side of Magic"). The first episode was about Howard Thurston. But the second episode explored the work of Harry Houdini, whose career Casellato explores in his book L’altra metà della magia. The series and the book both look at Thurston and Houdini in the scope of the history and evolution of magic as an art form.

=== Theater ===
- Composer Andy Pape and librettist Erik Clausen's Danish-language opera Houdini den store (1988; English: Houdini the Great) was staged at the Royal Danish Theatre in 1989. It was subsequently performed on tour from Denmark to the Miller Theatre at Columbia University in 1999; The work has been performed throughout Denmark, and his enjoyed popularity in that country.
- On 24 April 2026 the play 'Magic', written by and starring David Haig, was premiered at the Chichester Festival Theatre exploring the relationship between Houdini and Conan Doyle.

=== Music ===
- Gilbert O'Sullivans debut-album Himself contains the song «Houdini said», with the words: «Houdini said to get out of bed Was the hardest thing he could do Yet when he's tied strait-jacket plied He's out at the count of two»
- Kate Bush's 1982 album The Dreaming features a song titled "Houdini", which fictionalizes Bess Houdini's seances; the album's cover also depicts Bush with a key in her mouth, a reference to Bess's alleged assistance to her husband.
- Singer-songwriter Dua Lipa's 2023 song "Houdini" is named after Houdini.
- Rapper Eminem's 2024 song "Houdini" is named after Houdini.

=== Fiction ===
- In this 2026 novel, spiritualism detractor Houdini faces off against famous medium Margery Crandon, Maryka Biaggio. (2026). Margery and Me. Regal House Publishing.
- In the 1975 novel Ragtime, by E. L. Doctorow, Houdini appears as one of the main protagonists alongside a cast of both fictional and historical characters such as J. P. Morgan, Emma Goldman, Evelyn Nesbit, and Henry Ford.

== Homage to Houdini ==
=== Film ===
- The 1953 biopic film Houdini (loosely adapted from the 1928 semi-biographical novel by Harold Kellock) featured real-life husband and wife, Tony Curtis and Janet Leigh, as Harry and Bess in a fictionalized outline of his life.
- The 2007 supernatural romance film Death Defying Acts, directed by Gillian Armstrong, starring Guy Pearce as Harry Houdini and Catherine Zeta-Jones as Mary McGarvie, a psychic out to con him. The screenplay is historical fiction set in 1926, written by Tony Grisoni and Brian Ward.

=== Play ===
- A 2013 play, also titled Houdini, focused on "The Brothers Houdini" and starred Stuart Brennan, who also wrote the play, as Theodore. Magician Jim Nichols portrayed Harry, while Bess was portrayed by Evanna Lynch.
- The 2015 play Impossible premiered at the St James Theatre and the Arts Theatre in London; the play examines the relationship between Harry Houdini and Arthur Conan Doyle and was written by Khan and Salinsky.

=== Residency ===
- From 1995 to 2002, an extravaganza titled EFX featuring Houdini as one character of a leading quadruple role, established a residency at the MGM Grand Hotel & Casino on the Las Vegas Strip. Over the span of eight years, in chronological order, the show's headliners were Michael Crawford, David Cassidy, Tommy Tune, and Rick Springfield.

== Published works ==
Houdini published a number of books during his career (some of which were written by his friend Walter B. Gibson, the creator of The Shadow).

- The Right Way to Do Wrong: An Exposé of Successful Criminals (1906)
- Handcuff Secrets (1907)
- The Unmasking of Robert-Houdin (1908), a debunking study of Robert-Houdin's alleged abilities.
- Magical Rope Ties and Escapes (1920)
- Miracle Mongers and Their Methods (1920)
- Houdini's Paper Magic (1921)
- A Magician Among the Spirits (1924)
- Houdini Exposes the Tricks Used by the Boston Medium "Margery" (1924)
- "Imprisoned with the Pharaohs" (1924), a short story ghostwritten by H. P. Lovecraft.
- "How I Unmask the Spirit Fakers", article for Popular Science (November 1925)
- "How I Do My 'Spirit Tricks'", article for Popular Science (December 1925)
- "Conjuring" (1926), article for the Encyclopædia Britannica's 13th edition.

== Filmography ==
- Merveilleux Exploits du Célébre Houdini à Paris – Cinema Lux (1909) – playing himself
- The Master Mystery – Octagon Films (1918) – playing Quentin Locke
- The Grim Game – Famous Players–Lasky/Paramount Pictures (1919) – playing Harvey Handford
- Terror Island – Famous Players–Lasky/Paramount (1920) – playing Harry Harper
- The Man from Beyond – Houdini Picture Corporation (1922) – playing Howard Hillary
- Haldane of the Secret Service – Houdini Picture Corporation/FBO (1923) – playing Heath Haldane

== Posters ==
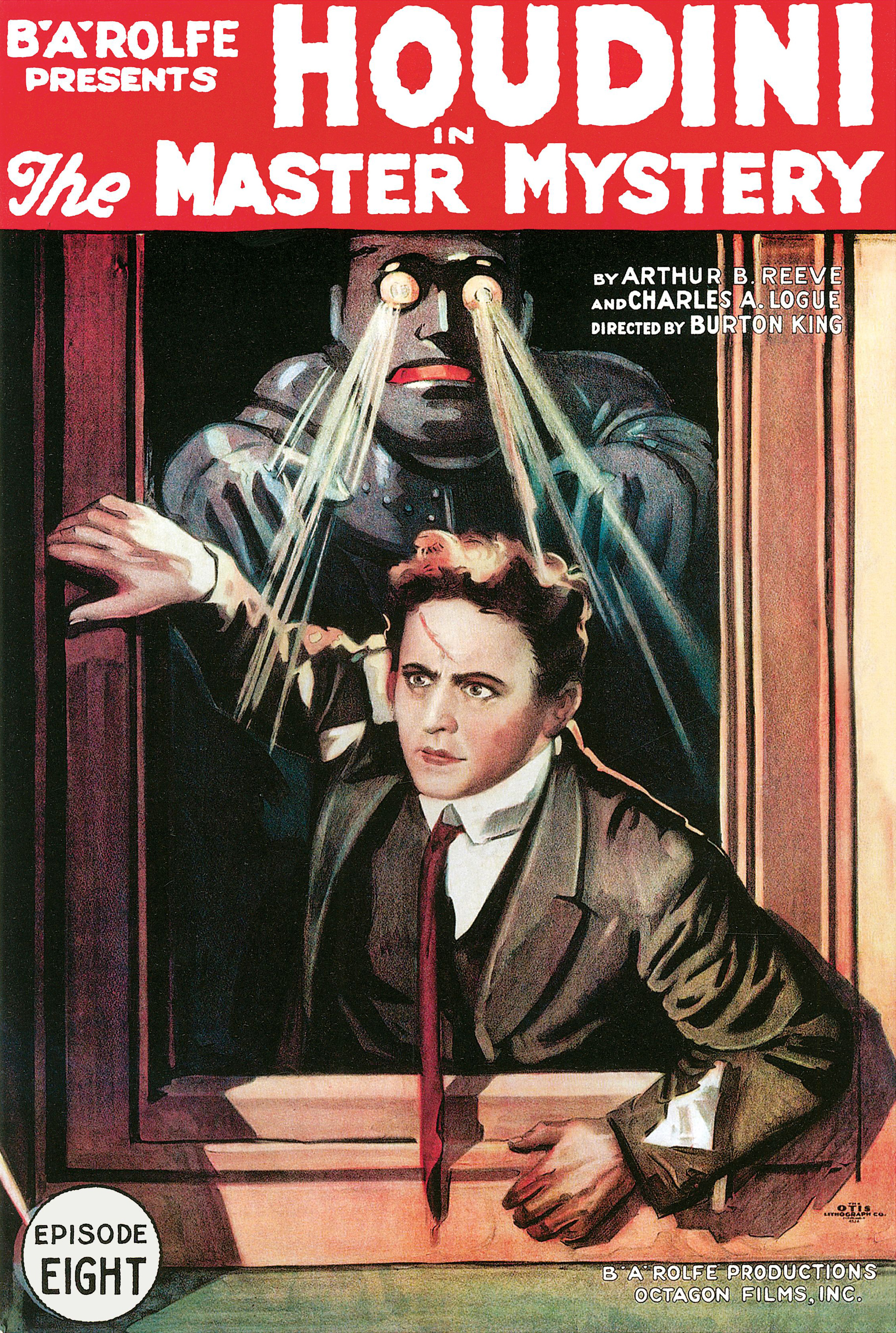

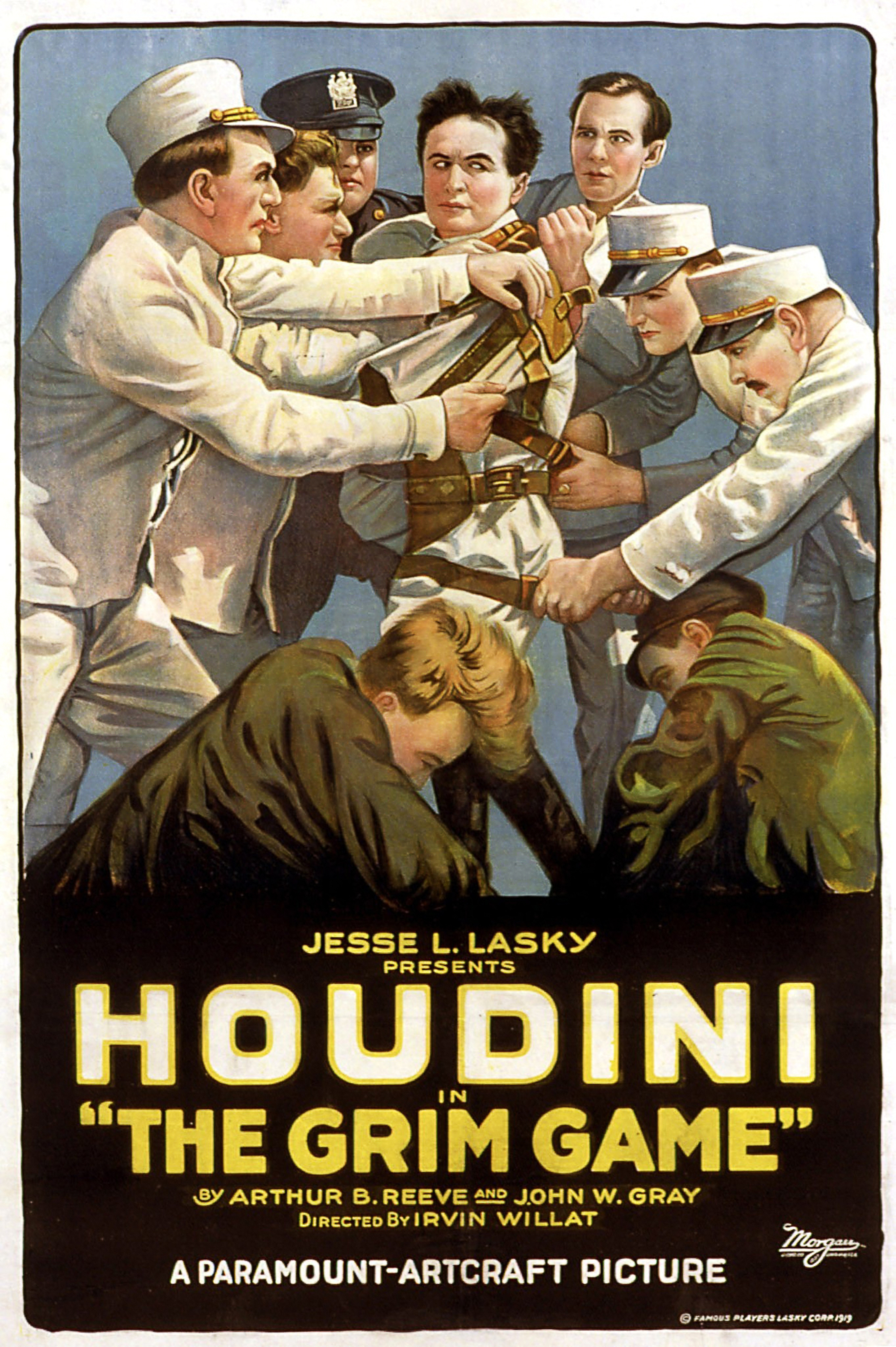

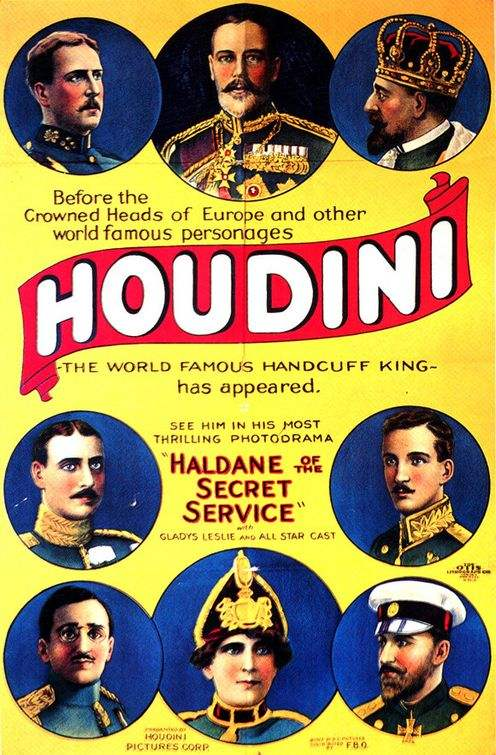

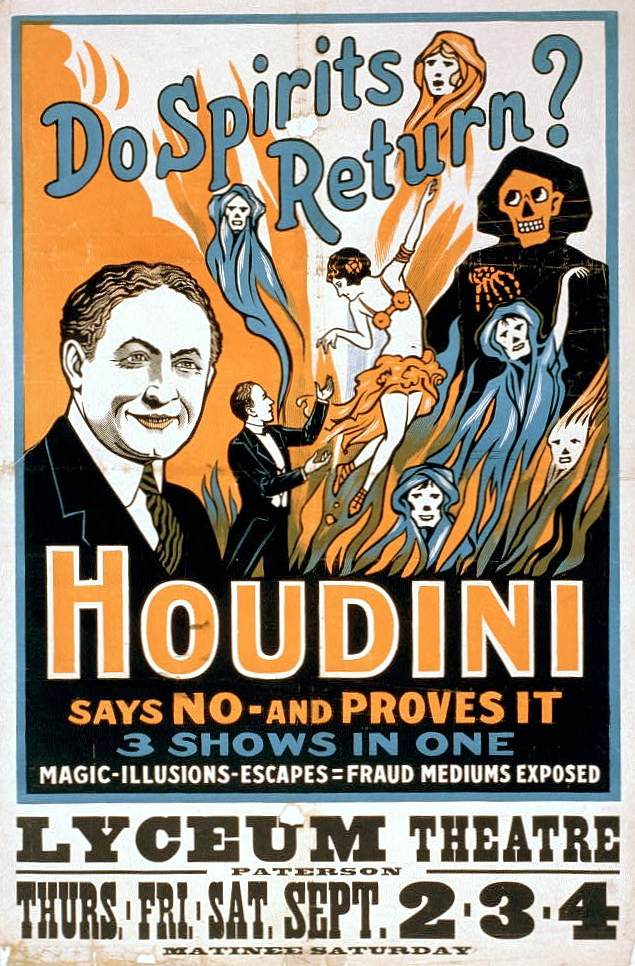

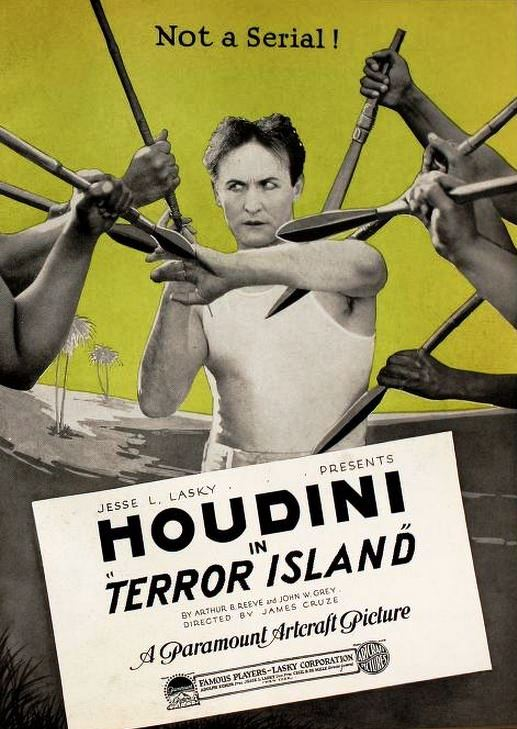

== See also ==
- List of magic museums
- List of magicians

== Bibliography ==
- Brandon, Ruth (1993). The Life and Many Deaths of Harry Houdini. London: Secker & Warburg, Ltd. ISBN 978-0-394-22415-2.
- Fleischman, Sid (2006). Escape! The Story of The Great Houdini. Greenwillow Books. ISBN 978-0-06-085094-4.
- Gresham, William Lindsay Houdini: The Man Who Walked Through Walls (New York: Henry Holt & Co., 1959).
- Henning, Doug with Charles Reynolds. Houdini: His Legend and His Magic (New York: Times Books, 1978). ISBN 978-0446873284.
- Kalush, William; Sloman, Larry (2006). The Secret Life of Houdini: The Making of America's First Superhero. New York: Simon & Schuster. ISBN 978-0-7432-7207-0.
- Kellock, Harold. Houdini: His Life-Story from the recollections and documents of Beatrice Houdini, (Harcourt, Brace Co., June 1928).
- Kendall, Lance. Houdini: Master of Escape (New York: Macrae Smith & Co., 1960). ISBN 006092862X.
- Meyer, M.D., Bernard C. Houdini: A Mind in Chains (New York: E. P. Dutton & Co., 1976). ISBN 0841504482.
- Randi, James; Sugar, Bert Randolph (1976). Houdini, his life and art. New York: Grosset & Dunlap. ISBN 978-0-448-12546-6.
- Silverman, Kenneth (1996). Houdini!!!: The Career of Ehrich Weiss: American Self-Liberator, Europe's Eclipsing Sensation, World's Handcuff King & Prison Breaker. New York: HarperCollins Publishers. ISBN 0-06-092862-X.
- Stanyon, Ellis (1901). Magic: Harry Houdini Collection. London: Ellis Stanyon.
- Williams, Beryl & Samuel Epstein. The Great Houdini: Magician Extraordinary (New York: Julian Messner, Inc., 1950).
