= Sidney Hollis Radner =

American collector (1919–2011)

Sidney Hollis Radner (December 8, 1919 – June 26, 2011) was a rug salesman from Holyoke, Massachusetts, who owned one of the world's largest and most valuable collections of Harry Houdini artifacts. Radner was a 1937 graduate of Worcester Academy and matriculated to Yale College.

== Biography ==
He was born on December 8, 1919, and attended Yale University.

Houdini's brother Theodore Hardeen considered Radner as his protégé. Hardeen died in June 1945, willed most of Houdini's collection to Radner.

Radner died of cancer in Holyoke on June 26, 2011, at the age of 91.
