= Will Goldston =

English stage magician (1878–1948)

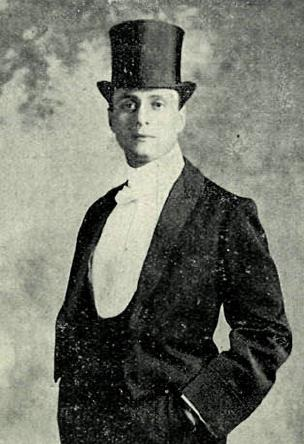
- Born: 1878; Liverpool
- Died: 24 February 1948 (aged 69–70); Folkestone
- Occupation: Magician

Will Goldston (1878–1948) was an English stage magician in the first half of the 20th century.

== Career ==
He was born in the city of Liverpool and became interested in the subject at the age of eleven. As well as being a performer he was involved in the merchandising of "magic tricks" and was employed by the Gamages department store in central London, 1905-1914. During this time he edited the Magician Annual (1907–1912) and, in 1912, Will Goldston's Exclusive Magical Secrets in an edition of one thousand that was republished in 1977.

He was a lifelong friend of Harry Houdini. Houdini biographer William Lindsay Gresham noted that "Houdini's correspondence with the London magic dealer Will Goldston covered some twenty years; the Escape King wrote his friend at least once a week." Goldston supervised the publication of Houdini's book, Handcuff Secrets (1909) and published his Magical Rope Ties and Escapes in 1921. Goldston published many other magicians' works through his own publishing company Will Goldston Ltd. He was the founder and president of the London-based Magicians' Club which he founded in 1911.

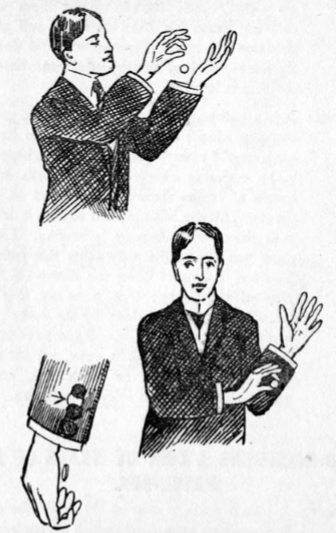
Goldston's trick of passing a coin through his sleeve, illustrated in his 1920 book More Tricks and Puzzles Without Mechanical Apparatus

Goldston was a prolific writer on the history of magic and illusions. He was sometimes criticized for revealing the secrets of magicians. In response to this, Goldston wrote that "It is a fact that many of the cleverest members of my profession have selfishly carried their secrets to the grave. Houdini and Chung Ling Soo are cases in point. That is not fair play. Magic must live after its creators have passed on. I feel I have a duty to perform, and trust that, after my death, others will be found to carry on the work that I have started."

In his book Sensational Tales of Mystery Men (1929), he suggested that Chung Ling Soo's death was the result of a planned suicide. This opinion has been criticized by other magic historians such as Will Dexter and Jim Steinmeyer.

Goldston died suddenly on 24 February 1948 in Folkestone, according to a report in The Stage newspaper.

== Spiritualism ==
Goldston was one of the very few magicians to ever be converted to spiritualism. He believed psychic phenomena and spiritualism to be real; however, he also wrote that many mediums were frauds who used conjuring tricks. He summarized his views on spiritualism in his book Tricks of the Masters (1942).

== Publications ==
- Secrets of Magic for Professional and Amateur Entertainers (1904)
- Latest Conjuring (1905)
- Crystal Gazing: Astrology, Palmistry, Planchette, and Spiritualism (1906)
- The Young Conjurer: A Book for Amateurs (1910)
- Juggling Secrets (1911)
- Secrets of Stage Hypnotism, Stage Electricity, and Bloodless Surgery (1912)
- Stage Illusions (1912)
- Exclusive Magical Secrets (1912)
- More Tricks and Puzzles with Patter (1915)
- Card & Ball Tricks With Patter (1916)
- Will Goldston's Easy Road to Magic: In Seven Lessons (1916)
- Magic for the Forces (1918)
- Easy Magic With Patter (1919)
- Tricks You Should Know (1920)
- Will Goldston's Card System of Exclusive Magical Secrets (1920)
- More Exclusive Magical Secrets (1921)
- Simple Conjuring Tricks that Anybody Can Perform (1922)
- Further Exclusive Magical Secrets (1927)
- Great Magicians' Tricks (1931)
- Secrets of Famous Illusionists (1933)
- Great Tricks Revealed (1936)
- Tricks of the Masters (1942)
