= Theodore Hardeen =

Hungarian-American entertainer (1876–1945)

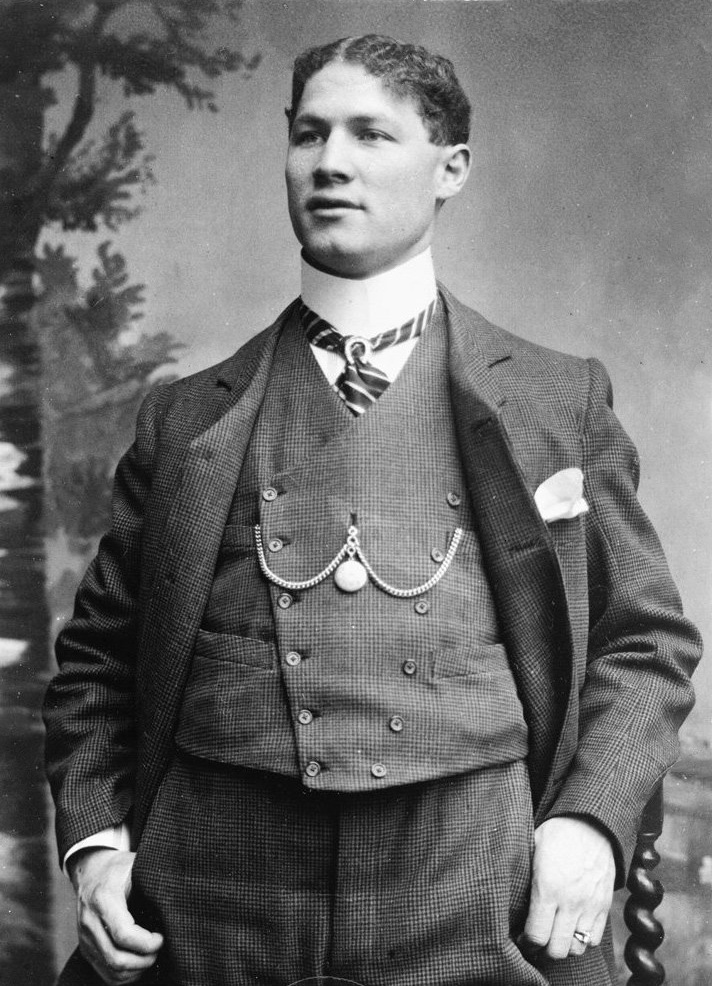
- Hardeen in 1905
- Born: Ferenc Dezső Weisz; March 4, 1876; Budapest, Kingdom of Hungary, Austria-Hungary
- Died: June 12, 1945 (aged 69); Manhattan, New York, U.S.
- Occupation: Magician
- Years active: 1893–1945
- Relatives: Harry Houdini (brother)

Ferenc Dezső Weisz (March 4, 1876 – June 12, 1945), known as Theodore "Dash" Hardeen, was a Hungarian-American magician and escape artist who was the younger brother of Harry Houdini. Hardeen, who usually billed himself as the "brother of Houdini", was the founder of the Magician's Guild. Hardeen was the first magician to conceive escaping from a straitjacket in full view of the audience, rather than behind a curtain.

== Early life ==
Hardeen was born as "Ferenc Dezső Weisz" (or "Ferencz Dezső Weisz") in Budapest, and went by the name "Theodore Weiss" when he and his family were living in Appleton, Wisconsin. He was known as "Deshi" and later "Dash" by his parents.

In 1893, Hardeen performed with Houdini at Coney Island as "The Brothers Houdini". While he and Harry were there, Harry met and married Wilhelmina Beatrice "Bess" Rahner.

== Career ==
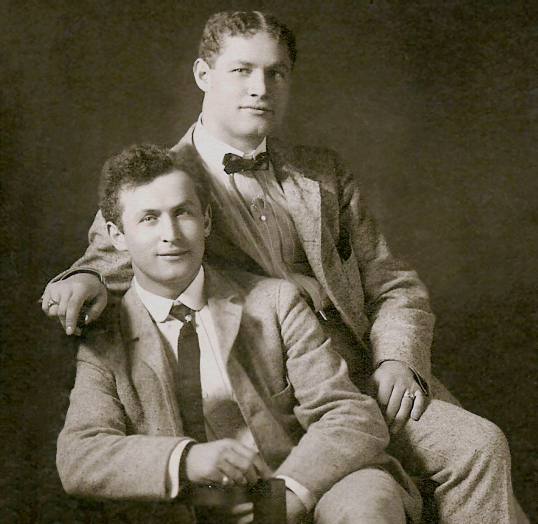
Hardeen with his brother, Houdini (seated left) c. 1901

Will Goldston, English stage magician and editor of the Magician Annual, wrote that:

"Hardeen learned his business from Houdini, and he learned it well, as no man could have failed to do with such a master. But the natural ability was always there. Even if Houdini had not existed to point the way, it is quite likely that Hardeen would have become an escape artiste. I have seen him perform several times, and have marvelled at his achievements. The huge chains in the cartoon are hardly an exaggeration of those from which he breaks loose. The handcuffs but a simple thing compared with those with which he is used to toy. Hardeen, like his more famous brother Harry Houdini is a great favourite in the magical world. He is a man of considerable culture and one of the best raconteurs I have ever met. Like Houdini, he is willing to expend both time and money freely to further the cause of magic. Both the amateurs and the professionals of our number regard him as a friend. And the general public regard him as a brilliant artiste and a thrilling entertainer."

After his brother's death in 1926, Hardeen played the vaudeville circuit, doing many of his late brother's routines. From 1938 to 1941, he was featured in Olsen and Johnson's Broadway revue, Hellzapoppin. During World War II, he performed for the troops (as his brother had done during World War I).

In 1936, Hardeen starred in a Vitaphone short film for Warner Bros. called Medium Well Done.

== Personal life and death ==
Like his brother, Hardeen was skeptical of the claims of spiritualist mediums. With his friend Julien Proskauer, he exposed the fraudulent methods of the mediums.

Houdini, in his will, requested that all his files be given to Hardeen and destroyed ("I give, devise and bequeath to my brother, Theodore, Professionally known as "Hardeen" all my theatrical effects, new mysteries and illusions and accompanying paraphernalia, to be burnt and destroyed upon his death.") On August 15, 1927, Hardeen's Brooklyn home was broken into and some of Houdini's apparatuses were damaged. Later that year, Hardeen burned all of Houdini's personal files in a furnace in his basement.

In 1945, while planning on writing a book about his brother, Hardeen went to Manhattan's Doctors Hospital for a simple operation. He unexpectedly died of complications while recovering from the procedure. He was 69 years old.

== Legacy ==
During his final show on May 29, 1945, in Ridgeway, Queens, Hardeen named his chief assistant, Douglas Geoffrey, his official successor. Geoffrey then went on to perform as "Hardeen, Jr."; he died January 14, 1990, at the age of 82.

Richard Valentine Pitchford (1895–1973) took over the Magicians' Guild after Hardeen's death. Sidney Hollis Radner received the Houdini collection from Hardeen.

Hardeen appears as a character in season one of Boardwalk Empire, played by Remy Auberjonois.

== Gallery ==
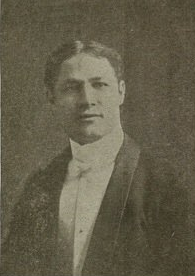
Hardeen in 1903

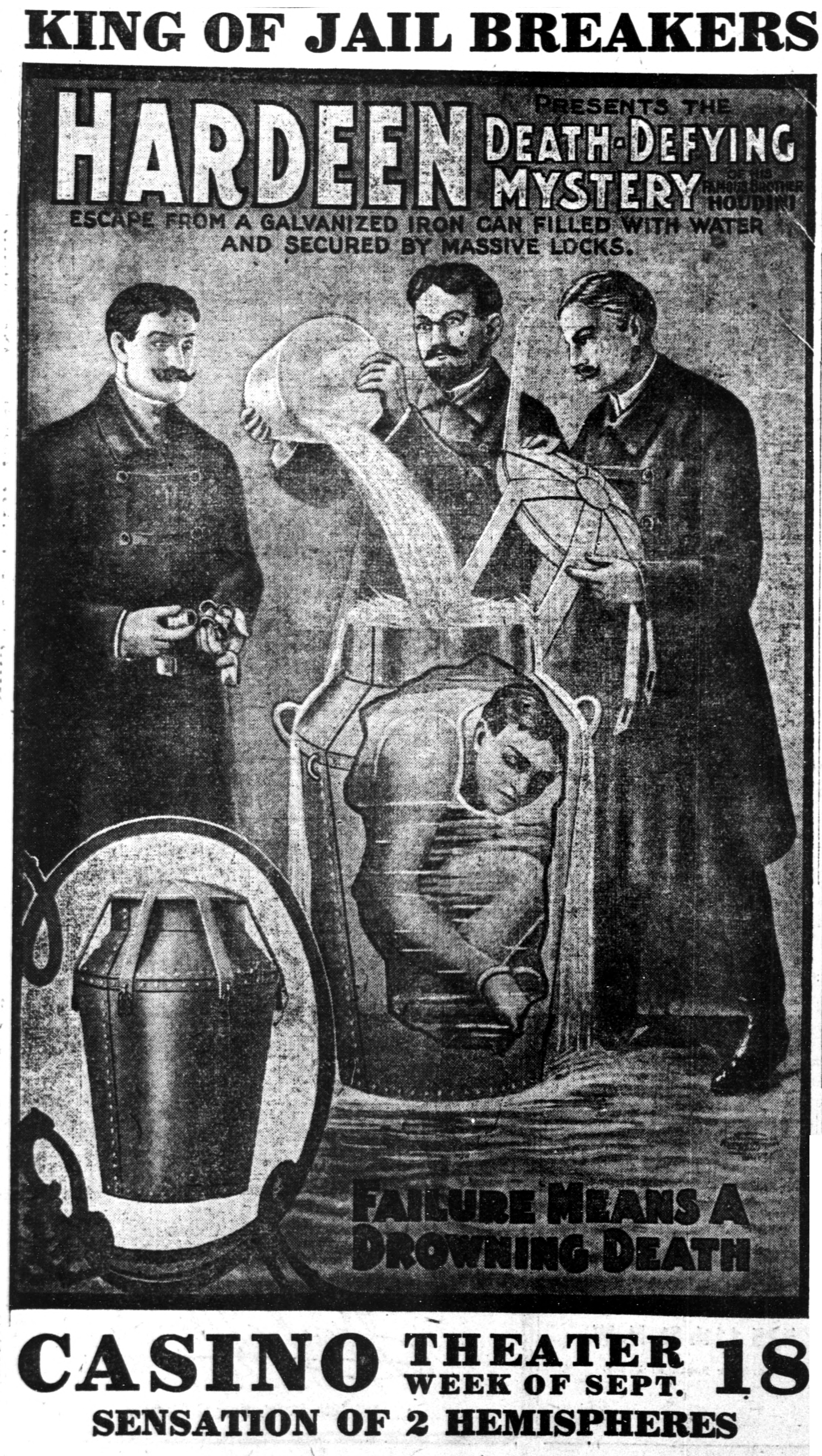
A poster for a performance at a theater, c. 1911

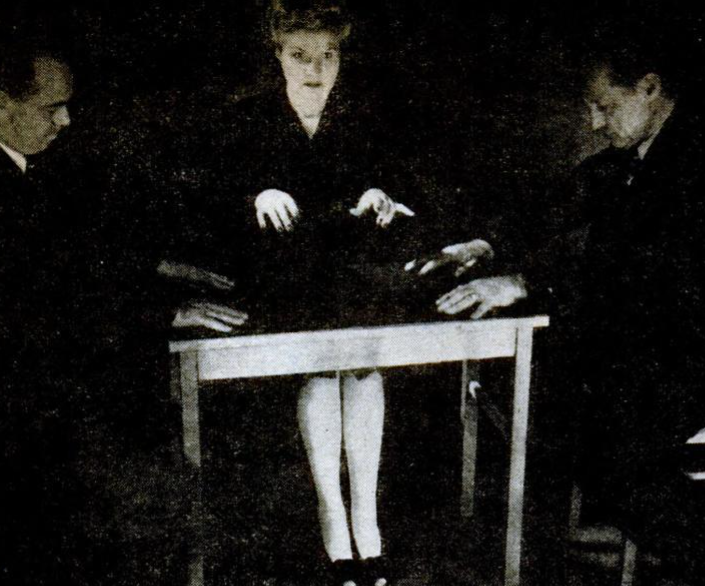
Magicians Julien Proskauer (left) and Hardeen (right) revealing a fraudulent method of table-turning. Both wore wrist bands with metal hooks to lift the séance table.

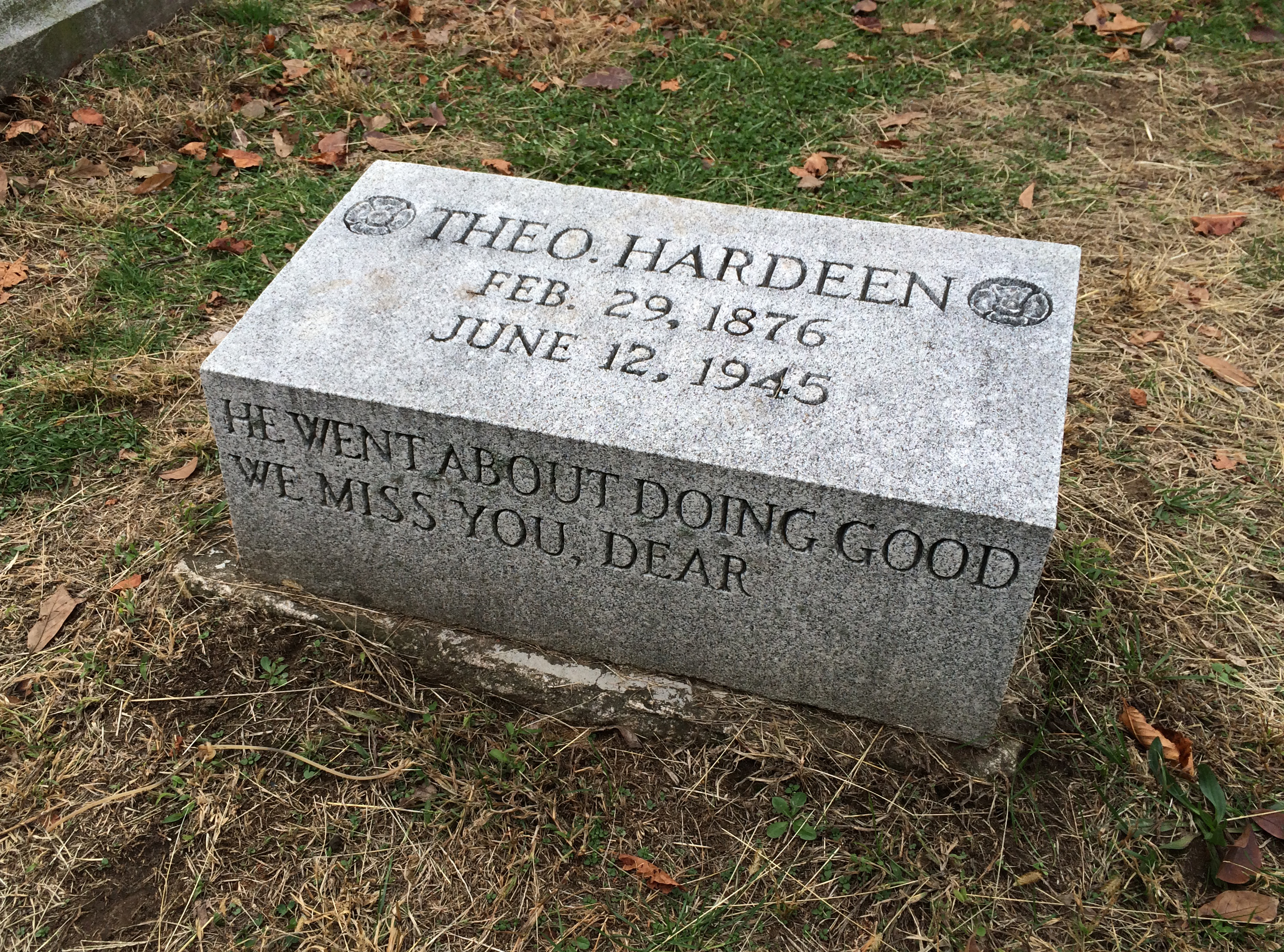
Hardeen's tombstone at the Houdini gravesite at Machpelah Cemetery in Queens. The inscription reads: "He went about doing good. We miss you, dear."
