= Jack Webber =

Welsh spiritualist medium (1907–1940)

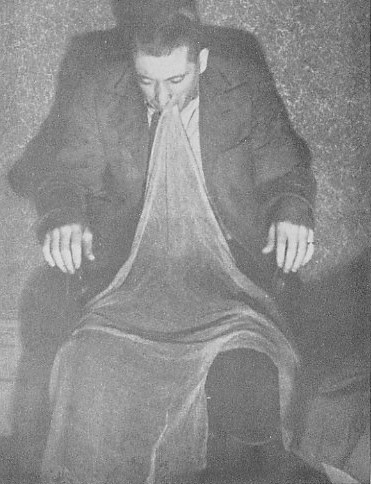
Webber with ectoplasm.

Jack Webber (1907–1940) was a Welsh spiritualist medium.

Webber worked as a miner in Loughor, Swansea and was introduced to spiritualism by his wife. He claimed his own mediumistic abilities such as levitation of objects, ectoplasm, psychokinesis and communicating with spirit voices. Webber claimed his spirit guides were 'Paddy' and 'Reuben'.

Webber was not scientifically tested by the Society for Psychical Research and some researchers have speculated that he performed his phenomena through trickery. During séances infrared flashlight photographs were taken of his phenomena which spiritualist writers have claimed is evidence for spirit communication, however, skeptics have written the ectoplasm in the photographs resembles cheesecloth or gauze.

According to the magician Julien Proskauer the floating trumpet of Webber was a trick. Close examination of photographs reveal Webber to be holding a telescopic reaching rod attached to the trumpet, and sitters in his séances only believed it to have levitated because the room was so dark they could not see the rod. Webber would cover the rod with crepe paper as ectoplasm to disguise its real construction. During the séances of Webber "spirit" voices were heard and the psychical researcher Hereward Carrington speculated that the voices were a trick performed by the medium himself by attaching a trumpet to the end of a telescopic reaching rod or a rubber tube.

The spiritual writer Harry Edwards supported the mediumship of Webber and included the photographs in his book The Mediumship of Jack Webber. The book was heavily criticized by the psychical researcher Michael Coleman who wrote "Edwards's book is essentially anecdotal, written from memory, often long after the events described. Thus we do not know where, when or for how long the individual sittings were held. We do not know how many sitters were present at each sitting, and we know the names of very few of them. But most importantly, we do not have those detailed sequences of events, with timings, that are necessary to arrive at a realistic assessment of any supposedly paranormal occurrences. Most of Edwards's account is unsupported by any independent witnesses".
