= Levitation (paranormal) =

Rising of a human body and other objects into the air by mystical means

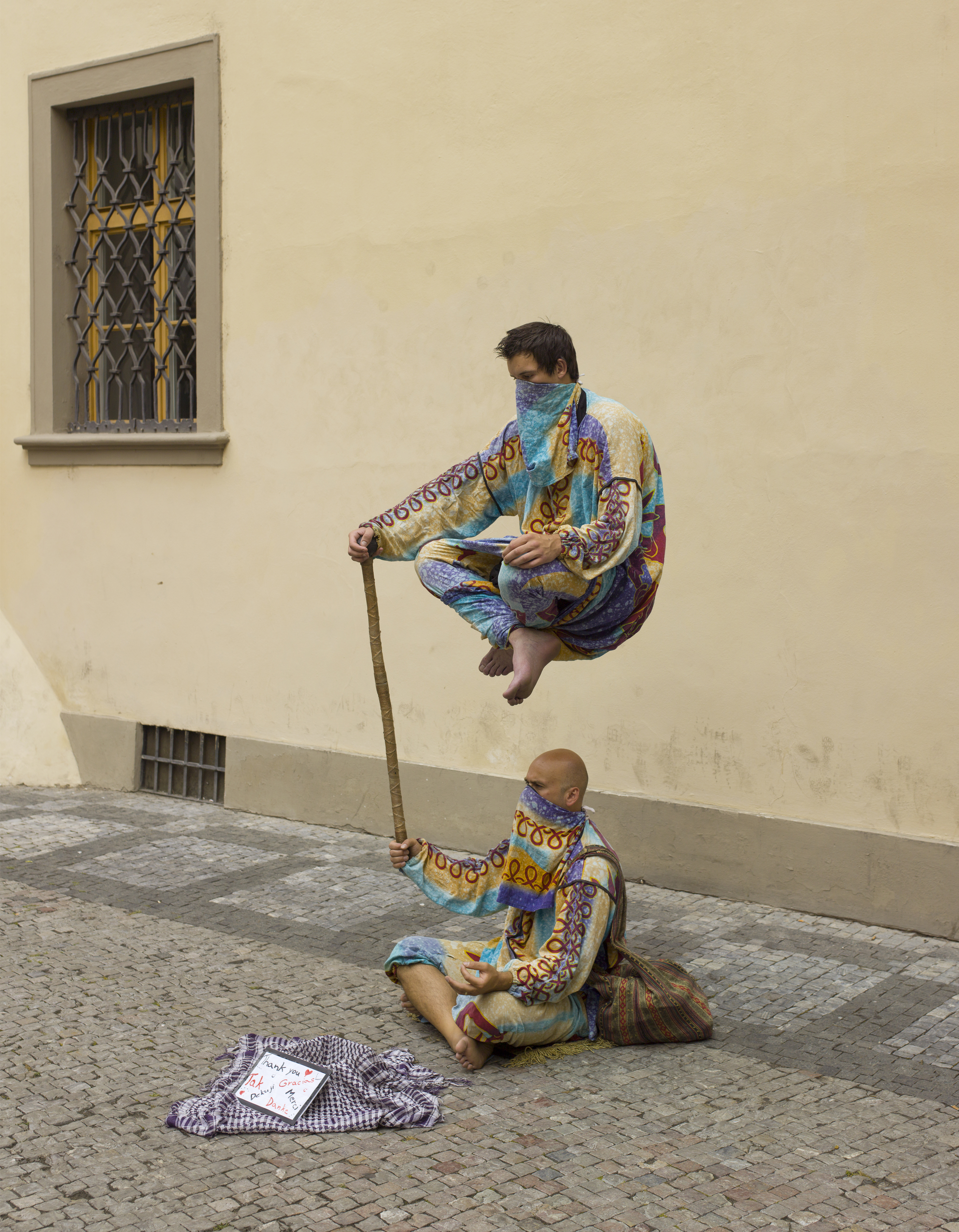
Levitation trick performed by street artists in Prague

Levitation or transvection, in the paranormal or religious context, is the claimed ability to raise a human body or other object into the air by mystical means.

While believed in some religious and New Age communities to occur due to supernatural, miraculous, psychic, or "energetic" phenomena, there is no scientific evidence of levitation occurring. Alleged cases of levitation can usually be explained by deception and fraud, such as trickery, illusion, and hallucination.

== Religious views ==
Various religions have claimed examples of levitation amongst their followers. This is generally used either as a demonstration of the validity or power of the religion, or as evidence of the holiness or adherence to the religion of the particular levitator.

== Levitation by mediums ==
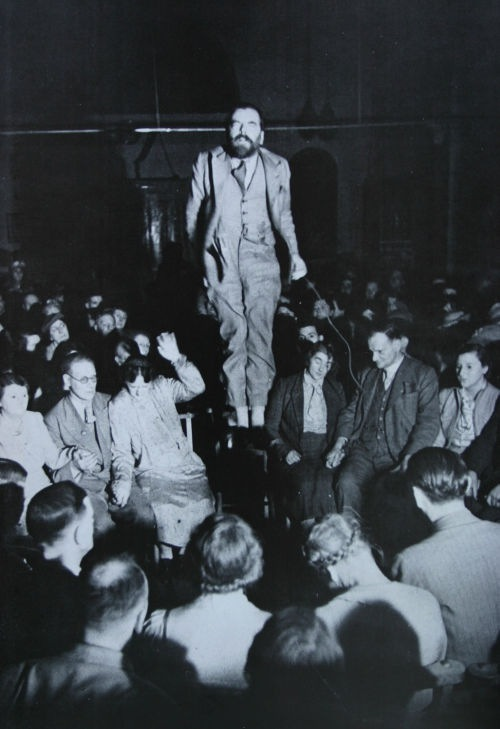
Colin Evans, who claimed spirits levitated him into the air, was exposed as a fraud.

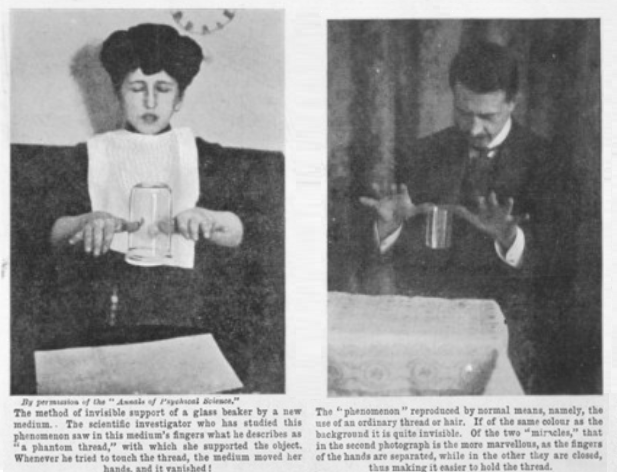
Spiritualist medium Stanisława Tomczyk (left) and the magician William Marriott (right) who exposed her deceptive trickery

Many mediums have claimed to have levitated during séances, especially in the 19th century in Britain and America. Many have been shown to be frauds, using wires and stage magic tricks. Daniel Dunglas Home, a prolific and well-documented levitator of himself and other objects, was said by spiritualists to levitate outside a window. Skeptics have disputed such claims. The researchers Joseph McCabe and Trevor H. Hall exposed the "levitation" of Home as nothing more than him moving across a connecting ledge between two iron balconies.

The magician Joseph Rinn gave a full account of fraudulent behavior observed in a séance of Eusapia Palladino and explained how her levitation trick had been performed. Milbourne Christopher summarized the exposure:

"Joseph F. Rinn and Warner C. Pyne, clad in black coveralls, had crawled into the dining room of Columbia professor Herbert G. Lord's house while a Palladino seance was in progress. Positioning themselves under the table, they saw the medium's foot strike a table leg to produce raps. As the table tilted to the right, due to pressure of her right hand on the surface, they saw her put her left foot under the left table leg. Pressing down on the tabletop with her left hand and up with her left foot under the table leg to form a clamp, she lifted her foot and "levitated" the table from the floor."

The levitation trick of the medium Jack Webber was exposed by the magician Julien Proskauer. According to Proskauer, he would use a telescopic reaching rod attached to a trumpet to levitate objects in the séance room. The physicist Edmund Edward Fournier d'Albe investigated the medium Kathleen Goligher at many sittings and concluded that no paranormal phenomena such as levitation had occurred with Goligher and stated he had found evidence of fraud. D'Albe had claimed the ectoplasm substance in the photographs of Goligher from her séances were made from muslin.

== In photography ==
A person photographed while bouncing may appear to be levitating. This optical illusion is used by religious groups and by spiritualist mediums, claiming that their meditation techniques allow them to levitate in the air. Usually telltale signs can be found in the photography indicating that the subject was in the act of bouncing, like blurry body parts, a flailing scarf, hair being suspended in the air, etc.

== Levitation in popular culture ==
=== Literature ===
- Incidents in my Life autobiography by Daniel Dunglas Home
- Mr. Vertigo novel by Paul Auster

=== Film ===
- The Exorcist (1973), directed by William Friedkin
- Ghostbusters (1984), directed by Ivan Reitman
- The Boy Who Could Fly (1986), directed by Nick Castle
- Candyman film series directed by Bernard Rose (1992); Bill Condon (1995); Turi Meyer (1999); Nia DaCosta (2021)

=== TV shows ===
- Stranger Things, season 4 (2022)
- Charmed, (1998-2006)

== See also ==
- Indian rope trick
- List of topics characterized as pseudoscience
- Mysticism
- Psychokinesis
