= Mark Singer =

American journalist (1950–2026)

- Born: October 19, 1950; Tulsa, Oklahoma, U.S.
- Died: June 19, 2026 (aged 75); New York City, U.S.
- Education: Yale University (B.A., 1972)
- Occupations: Journalist, author
- Employer: The New Yorker
- Notable work: Funny Money; Citizen K: The Deeply Weird American Journey of Brett Kimberlin; Trump and Me

Mark Jay Singer (October 19, 1950 – June 19, 2026) was an American journalist and a staff writer at The New Yorker.

== Early life ==
Singer was born in Tulsa, Oklahoma, in 1950 to Marjorie and Alex Singer. He attended Yale University, where his professors included William Zinsser, and graduated with a B.A. in 1972.

== Career ==
Singer joined the staff of The New Yorker in 1974. Several of his articles for the magazine were expanded into books, including Funny Money, his account of the collapse of the Penn Square Bank of Oklahoma City; and Citizen K: The Deeply Weird American Journey of Brett Kimberlin. Both Funny Money and Citizen K were praised by The New York Times, with reviewer Ben Yagoda comparing Singer to Joseph Mitchell.

Singer's profile of Ricky Jay, an illusionist and scholar, was published in 1993. The article was included in the 2000 anthology Life Stories: Profiles from The New Yorker, edited by David Remnick, and continues to be widely praised, with Manohla Dargis at The New York Times calling it "an excellent profile," and Amazon describing it as, "a prime example of what The New Yorker does best". Singer is credited with arranging a meeting between Jay and filmmakers Molly Bernstein and Alan Edelstein, whose documentary about Jay, Deceptive Practice: The Mysteries and Mentors of Ricky Jay, was released in 2012.

In 1996, Singer was assigned to write a profile of Donald Trump. The article, "Trump Solo", was deeply unflattering to Trump – portraying him as vain, boastful, and highly unreliable as a debtor – and began to recirculate in 2015, with the start of Trump's candidacy in the 2016 presidential election. Writing in The Guardian, columnist Oliver Burkeman called it "a characteristically excellent profile".

In 2005, "Trump Solo" was republished in Character Studies, an anthology of Singer's work. The book was received favorably by The New York Times Book Review, with reviewer Jeff MacGregor calling Singer "a terrific reporter, with a receptive ear for dialogue and a painter's eye for the salient detail". In response to the review in the Times, Trump wrote a letter to the editor, in which he called Singer a "loser" who "was not born with great writing ability". After reading the letter to the editor, Singer sent Trump a thank you note, ironically noting the added publicity Trump had drawn to Character Studies, and enclosing a check for $37.82 as a token of his "enormous gratitude", adding, "You're special to me." Trump sent the letter back, with the handwritten message, "MARK—YOU ARE A TOTAL LOSER—AND YOUR BOOK (AND WRITINGS) SUCKS! BEST WISHES DONALD P.S. AND I HEAR IT IS SELLING BADLY."

In 2016, Singer expanded "Trump Solo" into a book, titled Trump and Me, which included present-day reflections on Trump's presidential campaign. It was reviewed favorably by the Daily Telegraph, with reviewer Stephen Robinson writing that the book "offers clearer insight into the mind of the presumptive Republican nominee than any of the detailed biographies written over the years". In the Guardian, Hari Kunzru called it, "a viciously entertaining demolition of the branding savant with the peach pompadour".

In July 2017, Singer wrote a web column about efforts by the 115th United States Congress to repeal the Patient Protection and Affordable Care Act, including thoughts on his own history of treatment for autoimmune disease. The column, written in anticipation of a crucial vote on the repeal by Senator John McCain, was believed by many to have had a decisive effect on McCain's decision-making, with opinion writer Larry O'Connell calling it "tailor-made" for the senator.

== Death ==
Singer died in Manhattan on June 19, 2026, after being diagnosed with cancer of the salivary gland in 2025. He was 75.

== Bibliography ==
=== Books ===
- Singer, Mark (1985). Funny money. New York: Knopf.
- — (1989). Mr. Personality : profiles and talk pieces. New York: Knopf. ISBN 978-0-394-57210-9.
- — (1996). Citizen K : the deeply weird American journey of Brett Kimberlin. New York: Knopf.
- — (2004). Somewhere in America : under the radar with chicken warriors, left-wing patriots, angry nudists, and others. Boston: Houghton Mifflin. ISBN 978-0-618-19724-8.
- — (2005). Character studies : encounters with the curiously obsessed. Boston: Houghton Mifflin. ISBN 9780618197255.
- Greenberg, Alan C. & Mark Singer (2010). The rise and fall of Bear Stearns. New York: Simon & Schuster.
- Trump and Me. New York: Tim Duggan Books. 2016. ISBN 9780451498595.

=== Essays and reporting ===
- Singer, Mark (October 28, 2013). "Off the wall". The Talk of the Town. Ink. The New Yorker. Vol. 89, no. 34. pp. 24–25.
- — (December 15, 2014). "One father". The Talk of the Town. Vigilance Dept. The New Yorker. Vol. 90, no. 40. pp. 22–23.
- — (July 11–18, 2016). "Trump vs. 'Trump'". The Talk of the Town. Comment. The New Yorker. Vol. 92, no. 21. pp. 27–28.
- — (October 30, 2017). "Game over". The Talk of the Town. Moonlighting. The New Yorker. Vol. 93, no. 34. pp. 17–18.
- — (January 7, 2019). "Man vs. mouse". The Talk of the Town. Ingenuity Dept. The New Yorker. Vol. 94, no. 43. pp. 14–15.
- — (May 27, 2019). "Hello, darkness : the creator of several hit shows has dementia. And some thoughts about that". Profiles. The New Yorker. Vol. 95, no. 14. pp. 24–30.
