= Ricky Jay =

American magician and actor (1946–2018)

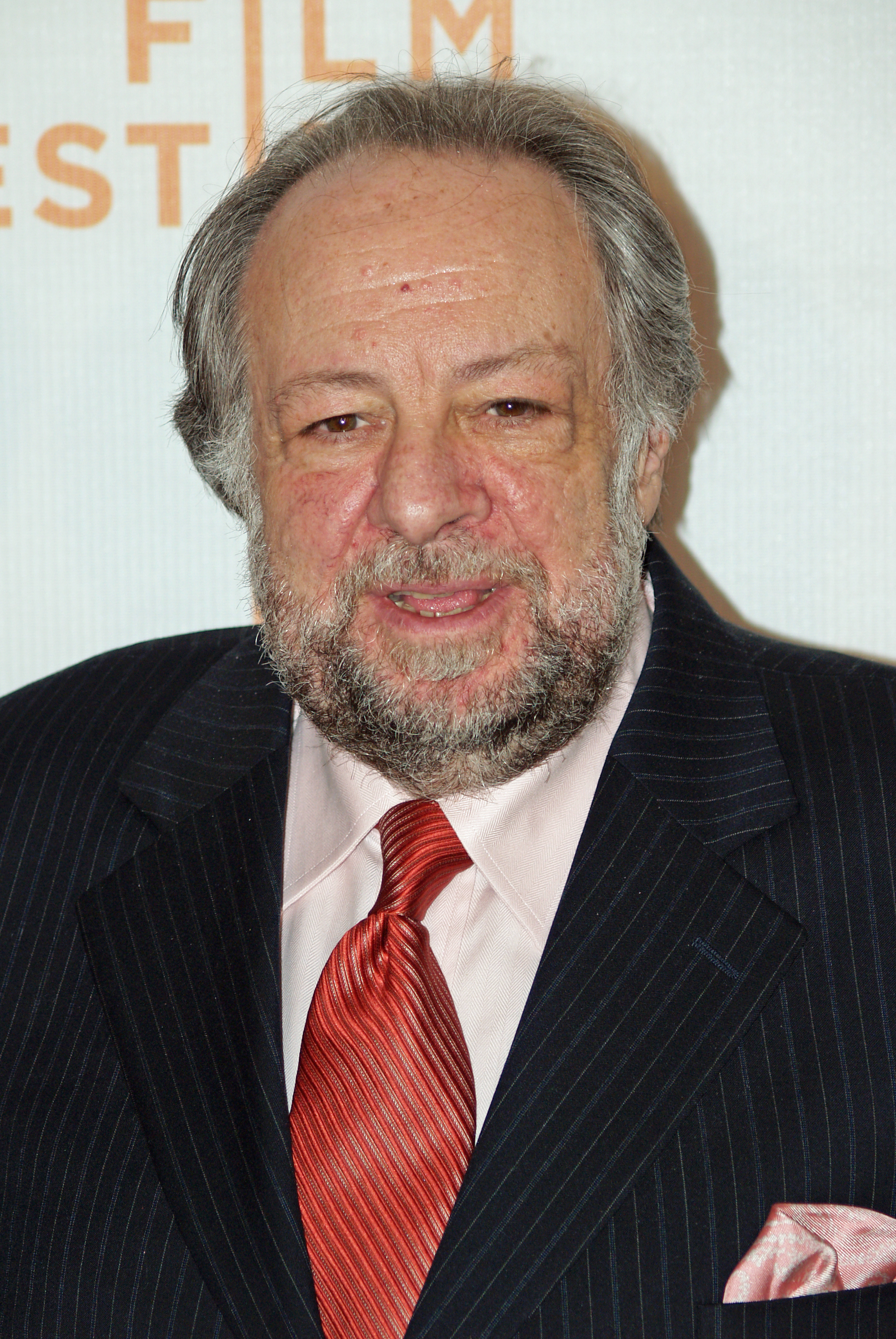
- Jay at the premiere of Redbelt in April 2008
- Born: Richard Jay Potash; June 26, 1946; New York City, U.S.
- Died: November 24, 2018 (aged 72); Los Angeles, California, U.S.
- Education: Cornell University (attended, dropped out)
- Occupations: Magician; actor; writer
- Known for: Sleight of hand, card tricks, history of magic
- Spouse: Chrisann Verges (m. 2002)

Richard Jay Potash (June 26, 1946 – November 24, 2018) was an American stage magician, actor, and writer. In a 1993 profile for The New Yorker, Mark Singer called Jay "perhaps the most gifted sleight of hand artist alive". In addition to sleight of hand, he was known for his card tricks, card throwing, memory feats, and stage patter. He also wrote extensively on magic and its history. His acting credits include The Prestige, The Spanish Prisoner, Mystery Men, Heist, Boogie Nights, Tomorrow Never Dies, Heartbreakers, State and Main, House of Games, Magnolia, Deadwood and Sneaky Pete. In 2015, he was the subject of an episode of PBS's American Masters, the only magician ever profiled in the series.

== Early life ==
Jay was born on June 26, 1946, in Brooklyn, New York, to Shirley (née Katz) and Samuel Potash. A member of a middle-class Jewish family, he grew up in Elizabeth, New Jersey. He rarely spoke publicly about his parents, but did share an anecdote: "My father oiled his hair with Brylcreem and brushed his teeth with Colgate", Jay recalled. "He kept his toothpaste in the medicine cabinet and the Brylcreem in a closet about a foot away. Once, when I was ten, I switched the tubes. All you need to know about my father is that after he brushed his teeth with Brylcreem he put the toothpaste in his hair."

During an interview on the National Public Radio program Fresh Air with Terry Gross, Jay said that possibly "the only kind memory I ever had of my parents" was when they secretly hired one of his idols, magician Al Flosso, to perform at his bar mitzvah. Jay's grandfather, Max Katz, was a certified public accountant and amateur magician who introduced Jay to magic.

== Career ==
=== Magician ===
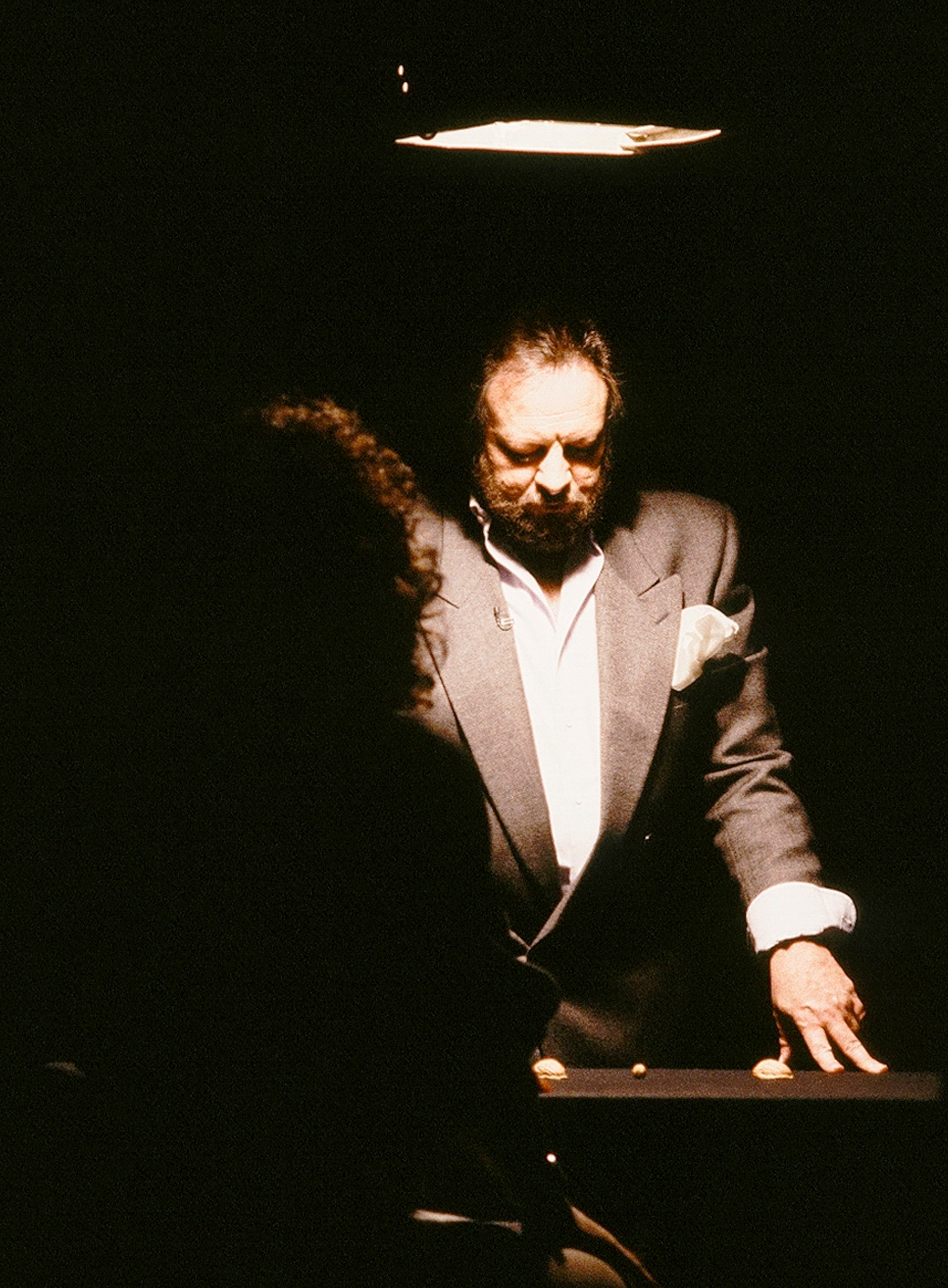
Appearing on The Secret Cabaret

Jay first performed in public at the age of seven, in 1953, when he appeared on the television program Time for Pets. He is most likely the youngest magician to perform a full magic act on TV, the first magician to ever play comedy clubs, and probably the first magician to open for a rock and roll band. At New York's Electric Circus in the 1960s, he performed on a bill between Ike and Tina Turner and Timothy Leary, who lectured about LSD.

During the 1960s and 1970s, Jay lived in Ithaca, New York, performing while also intermittently attending the Cornell University School of Hotel Administration, but later moved to the Los Angeles area.

He quickly developed a following among magic aficionados, and a reputation for sleight-of-hand feats that baffled even his colleagues. In his 1993 New Yorker profile of Jay, Mark Singer related the following story from playwright David Mamet and theater director Gregory Mosher:

Some years ago, late one night in the bar of the Ritz-Carlton Hotel in Chicago, [Jay] was performing magic with a deck of cards. Also present was a friend of Mamet and Mosher's named Christ Nogulich, the director of food and beverage at the hotel. After twenty minutes of disbelief-suspending manipulations, Jay spread the deck face up on the bar counter and asked Nogulich to concentrate on a specific card but not to reveal it. Jay then assembled the deck face down, shuffled, cut it into two piles, and asked Nogulich to point to one of the piles and name his card. "Three of clubs," Nogulich said, and he was then instructed to turn over the top card. He turned over the three of clubs. Mosher, in what could be interpreted as a passive-aggressive act, quietly announced, "Ricky, you know, I also concentrated on a card." After an interval of silence, Jay said, "That's interesting, Gregory, but I only do this for one person at a time." Mosher persisted: "Well, Ricky, I really was thinking of a card." Jay paused, frowned, stared at Mosher, and said, "This is a distinct change of procedure." A longer pause. "All right—what was the card?" "Two of spades." Jay nodded, and gestured toward the other pile, and Mosher turned over its top card. The deuce of spades. A small riot ensued.

Three of Jay's one-man shows, Ricky Jay and His 52 Assistants, Ricky Jay: On the Stem, and Ricky Jay: A Rogue's Gallery, were directed by Mamet, who also cast Jay in a number of his films.

A collector and historian, Jay was a student and friend of Dai Vernon, whom he called "the greatest living contributor to the magical art." He collected rare books and manuscripts, art, and other artifacts connected to the history of magic, gambling, unusual entertainments, and frauds and confidence games. Jay opposed any public revelations of the techniques of magic.

Following Jay's death, portions of his collection were sold at auction. In October 2021, Sotheby's held a two-day auction in New York devoted to the Ricky Jay Collection. In 2023, Potter & Potter Auctions held two further auctions from his collection, on February 25 and October 28.

Jay was formerly listed in the Guinness World Records for throwing a playing card 190 ft at 90 miles per hour (140 km/h) (the current record is 216 feet (66 m) by Rick Smith Jr.). He could throw a playing card into a watermelon rind (which he referred to as the "thick, pachydermatous outer melon layer" and "the most prodigious of household fruits") from ten paces. In addition, he was able to throw a card into the air like a boomerang and cut it cleanly in half with a pair of "giant scissors" upon its return. In his shows, he often attacked plastic animals with thrown cards in "self defense".

=== Actor ===
Jay appeared in a number of David Mamet films including House of Games, The Spanish Prisoner and Redbelt; he also appeared in a few episodes of the Mamet-produced TV series The Unit as a C.I.A. recruiter.

Jay played Henry Gupta, a henchman to villain Elliot Carver, in the James Bond film Tomorrow Never Dies; and appeared in Paul Thomas Anderson's Boogie Nights and Magnolia, as well as Christopher Nolan's The Prestige.

He joined the cast of the HBO western drama Deadwood as a recurring character and writer for the first season in 2004, playing card sharp Eddie Sawyer. He wrote the episode "Jewel's Boot Is Made for Walking" and left the series at the end of the first season.

=== Consultant ===
As an expert on magic, gambling, con games and unusual entertainment, Jay was a consultant on Hollywood projects for many years, beginning with his work on Francis Ford Coppola's production of Caleb Deschanel's The Escape Artist. Other early work included teaching Robert Redford how to manipulate coins for The Natural and working with Douglas Trumbull on his Showscan project New Magic (1983).

In 1992s, Jay and Michael Weber created a firm, Deceptive Practices, providing "Arcane Knowledge on a Need-to-Know Basis" to film, television and stage productions. By offering both vast historical expertise and creative invention, they were able to provide surprising practical solutions to real production challenges. Among many accomplishments, they designed the wheelchair that hid Gary Sinise's legs in Forrest Gump, the glass that "drinks itself" used by the gorilla in Congo, and an illusion "in which a man climbs to the top of a ladder of light and vanishes in midair" for the Broadway production of Angels in America: Perestroika.

Other projects they worked on included The Prestige, The Illusionist, Sneakers, Leap of Faith, Wolf, The Parent Trap, I Love Trouble, The Great Buck Howard, Heartbreakers, and Ocean's Thirteen, and Beetlejuice.

Additionally, he worked with libraries and museums on their collections, including the Mulholland Library of Conjuring and the Allied Arts and the Museum of Jurassic Technology in Culver City, California.

=== Lectures and exhibitions ===
Jay authored numerous articles and delivered many lectures and demonstrations on such subjects as conjuring literature, con games, sense perception, and unusual entertainments. Among his presentations:

- "Sleight and Shadow", at the New York Metropolitan Museum of Art
- "Belknap Visitor in the Humanities" lecture on the relationship between magicians and mediums, at Princeton University
- "Doing Likewise: Imitation, Emulation, and Mimesis", at the New York Institute of Humanities, hosted by Jonathan Miller.
- "Hocus Pocus in Perfection: Four Hundred Years of Conjuring and Conjuring Literature," the Harold Smith Memorial Lecture at Brown University.
- "Splendors of Decaying Celluloid", with Errol Morris, Rosamond Purcell and Bill Morrison at the New York Institute for the Humanities.
- "The Origins of the Confidence Game", at the conference of Police Against Confidence Crime.
- "Chirosophi: Sixteenth and Seventeenth Century Conjuring Literature," at the Henry E. Huntington Library in San Marino, California.
- "Fast and Loose: The Techniques and Literature of Cheating", at the William Andrew Clark Memorial Library, UCLA.
- "The Mystery of Fasting Impostors," and "The Avant Garde Art of Armless Calligraphers", at Amherst College.
- "Sense, Perception, & Nonsense" at the University of Rhode Island Festival of the Arts.
- "Illusion as Truth", at the International Design Conference in Aspen (keynote address).
- "Prose & Cons: The Early Literature of Cheating", at the New York Public Library (Pforzheimer Lecture Series) and the Chicago Humanities Festival.
- "Magic & Science", at the TED Conference in Monterey, California.

Jay also lectured at Harvard University, USC, the Grolier Club, the Hammer Museum, Getty Center, and Town Hall Theatre in New York City. In 1999 he guest-curated an exhibit at the Harvard Theater Collection entitled "The Imagery of Illusion: Nineteenth Century Magic and Deception."

Exhibitions of material from his collections have been mounted at the Hammer Museum, the Yerba Buena Center for the Arts, University of California, Davis, the Christine Burgin Gallery, the Museum of Jurassic Technology, and UCLA's Clark Library. He loaned material to the Getty Center for their exhibit "Devices of Wonder" the Skirball Museum, the Huntington Library, the Whitney Museum of Art, and the Metropolitan Museum of Art for an exhibit entitled "Wordplay: Matthias Buchinger's Drawings From the Collection of Ricky Jay" in 2016.

== Documentary film ==
Jay is the subject of the feature documentary Deceptive Practice: The Mysteries and Mentors of Ricky Jay, and of a 1995 BBC2 documentary titled Hustlers, Hoaxsters, Pranksters, Jokesters, and Ricky Jay.

== Death ==
Jay died on November 24, 2018, at age 72. His attorney Stan Coleman confirmed his death but further details were not immediately released. Later press coverage reported that Jay died of natural causes.

== Credits ==
=== Film ===
- House of Games (1987) – George / Vegas Man
- Things Change (1988) – Mr. Silver
- Homicide (1991) – Aaron
- Leap of Faith (1992) – Cons and Frauds Consultant
- The Spanish Prisoner (1997) – George Lang
- Boogie Nights (1997) – Kurt Longjohn
- Hacks (1997) – The Hat
- Tomorrow Never Dies (1997) – Henry Gupta
- Mystery Men (1999) – Vic Weems
- Magnolia (1999) – Burt Ramsey / Narrator
- State and Main (2000) – Jack
- Heartbreakers (2001) – Dawson's Auctioneer
- Heist (2001) – Don "Pinky" Pincus
- Incident at Loch Ness (2004) – Party Guest #5
- Last Days (2005) – Detective
- The Prestige (2006) – Milton
- The Great Buck Howard (2008) – Gil Bellamy
- Redbelt (2008) – Marty Brown
- The Brothers Bloom (2008) – Narrator (voice)
- Intense (2009) – John
- The Automatic Hate (2015) – Uncle Josh (final film role)

=== Television ===
- The Tonight Show Starring Johnny Carson (October 26, 1970)
- Doug Henning's World of Magic II (December 1976)
- Saturday Night Live (1977)
- The Ricky Jay Magic Show – BBC special (1978)
- Dinah! (July 11, 1979)
- The John Davidson Show (November 28, 1980)
- Simon & Simon – Bird (1983)
- The Paul Daniels Magic Show (1985)
- Arsenio (1988)
- Learned Pigs and Fireproof Women – 1 hour special for American TV (1989)
- The Secret Cabaret (two series made by Open Media for Channel 4, UK)
- D.L. Hughley Breaks the News (January 10, 1990)
- Civil Wars – Lenny NiCastro (November 11, 1991)
- Late Show with David Letterman (1994, 2013)
- The Ranger, the Cook and a Hole in the Sky – Hawkes (1995)
- Ricky Jay and His 52 Assistants – 1 hour version of his Off-Broadway show, taped for HBO (1996)
- Hustlers, Hoaxsters, Pranksters, Jokesters and Ricky Jay (1996)
- American Masters – "Richard Avedon: Darkness and Light" (1996)
- Late Night with Conan O'Brien (1998, 2002)
- The X-Files – The Amazing Maleeni / Herman Pinchbeck / Albert Pinchbeck in "The Amazing Maleeni" (2000)
- MythBusters – Episode 20, "Exploding Jawbreaker, Static Cannon, Deadly Playing Cards." Jay demonstrated card throwing, and the speed of his throws was clocked. (2003)
- Deadwood – Eddie Sawyer (2004), Season 1
- Kidnapped – Roger Prince (2006–07)
- The Unit – Agent Kern (2007–09)
- Lie to Me – Mason Brock (2009)
- FlashForward – Man in Warehouse / Ted Flosso (2009–10)
- 60 Minutes – Interviewed by Morley Safer for segment, "Pigeon Fever" (2010)
- The Simpsons – plays himself in episode "The Great Simpsina" (2011)
- Teen Titans Go! – plays voice in Robin's head in episode "The Date" (2013)
- The Tonight Show Starring Jimmy Fallon (March 31, 2014)
- Getting On – Thoracic Surgeon (2014)
- Sneaky Pete – T.H. Vignetti (2019)

=== Theater ===
- A Midsummer Night's Dream (1982); produced by Joseph Papp for The New York Shakespeare Festival.
- Ricky Jay & His 52 Assistants (1994)
- Ricky Jay: On The Stem (2002)
- Ricky Jay: A Rogue's Gallery (2009)

He also performed on the 2005 BBC Radio adaptation of David Mamet's Faustus.

=== Books ===
Jay was the author of eleven books:

- Cards as Weapons. Image Graphiques (1977). ISBN 0882010174.
- Learned Pigs & Fireproof Women. Villard (1986). ISBN 0394537505.
- Many Mysteries Unraveled: Conjuring Literature in America 1786–1874. Antiquarian Society (1990). ASIN B00FFJ0402.
- The Magic Magic Book. Whitney Museum Library Associates (1994). ASIN B004ONUJP0.
- Jay's Journal of Anomalies. Farrar, Straus and Giroux (2001). ISBN 0374178674.
- Dice: Deception, Fate, and Rotten Luck. Quantuck Lane Press (2002). ISBN 0971454817.
- Extraordinary Exhibitions: Broadsides from the Collection of Ricky Jay. Quantuck Lane Press (2005). ISBN 1593720122.
- Ricky Jay Plays Poker (Audio CD). Sony Legacy (2007). ASIN B000HT2MB4.
- Magic: 1400s–1950s (with Mike Caveney, Jim Steinmeyer) Taschen (2009). ISBN 383652807X.
- Celebrations of Curious Characters. McSweeney (2010). ISBN 1936365030.
- Matthias Buchinger: "The Greatest German Living". Siglio (2016).

Charles McGrath called Jay "perhaps the last of the great 19th-century authors." Jay's last book, Matthias Buchinger: "The Greatest German Living", was well-received, called "awe-inspiring" by the Los Angeles Times and "beguiling" by the New York Review of Books.

=== Music ===
Ricky Jay contributed to several projects in the music world, most notably the 2007 Sony release Ricky Jay Plays Poker, a box set containing a CD of poker-related songs (by Bob Dylan, Robert Johnson, Townes Van Zandt, Patsy Cline, Lorne Greene, Howard Da Silva, O. V. Wright, and several others), a DVD featuring Ricky Jay discussing and performing notable feats of card table deception, and a box of Ricky Jay playing cards.

He performed "The Fiddler" with Richard Greene on Hal Willner's sea shanty-compilation Rogue's Gallery: Pirate Ballads, Sea Songs, and Chanteys (2006), as well as "The Chantey of Noah and his Ark (Old School Song)" on its follow-up Son of Rogues Gallery: Pirate Ballads, Sea Songs & Chanteys (2013).

He appeared in the music video for Bob Dylan's song "Tweedle Dee & Tweedle Dum", from the album Love and Theft. During the production of the video, a screwdriver reportedly fell from the rafters and lodged in Jay's hand.

He appeared in the video for the Jerry Garcia and David Grisman single "The Thrill Is Gone", available on the DVD of the Grateful Dawg documentary.
