= Doctors Hospital (Manhattan) =

Hospital in New York City, US

General information
- Location: Manhattan, New York City
- Opened: 1929
- Closed: 2004
- Demolished: 2005

Doctors Hospital (1929–2004) was a hospital at 170 East End Avenue, between 87th and 88th Streets opposite Gracie Mansion in the Yorkville neighborhood of the Upper East Side of Manhattan, New York City. It served as the primary maternity hospital for uptown Manhattan births (Manhattan General served as such for Lower Manhattan). It was also known as a "fashionable treatment center for the well-to-do."

== History ==
The 14-floor hospital was founded in 1929 as Doctors Hospital.

Patients included Lilyan Tashman, Huguette Clark, Michael Jackson, Jackie Gleason, Marilyn Monroe, Robert Mueller, Jacqueline Susann, James Thurber, Clare Boothe Luce, Werner Hegemann, Oveta Culp Hobby, Charna Eisenberg, Anthony Ritter, Jr. and Eugene O'Neill. Socialite Ann Woodward, wife of banking heir William Woodward, Jr., was treated for shock at Doctors Hospital in 1955 after mistakenly shooting her husband.

People who died at Doctors Hospital included Theodore Hardeen, also known as Hardeen, Houdini's brother and a magician in his own right, who died at the age of 69 after a routine surgery in 1945.

Doctors was acquired by Beth Israel Medical Center in 1987.

In 2001, the medical facility had about 210 beds and more than 800 employees.

The hospital was closed in August 2004, and sold along with two nearby apartment buildings for $166.5 million. The building was razed in 2005, and replaced in 2008 with a 19-story, 110-unit residential condominium building.
