= Magicians Guild of America =

The Magician's Guild was an organization founded by Theodore Hardeen.

== Presidents ==
- Theodore Hardeen (1876–1945) and founder, 1944 to 1945
- Richard Valentine Pitchford (1895-1973) 1945 to ?
- George Jason
