= Richard Valentine Pitchford =

British magician (1895–1973)

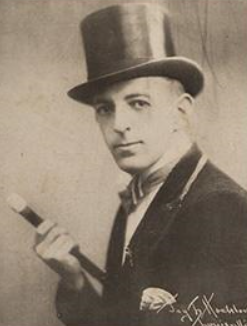
- Born: 24 November 1895; The Mumbles, Swansea, Wales
- Died: 13 November 1973 (aged 77); Gardiner, New York, U.S.
- Other name: Cardini
- Occupation: Magician

Richard Valentine Pitchford (24 November 1895 – 13 November 1973) was a Welsh master magician under the name Cardini, whose career spanned almost half a century. Born in Wales, he worked chiefly in the United States of America.

== Biography ==
Richard Valentine Pitchford was born in the Mumbles, Swansea, Wales on 24 November 1895. Some sources use the incorrect year of 1899.

He joined the British Army during World War I, where he passed time in the trenches by practicing card manipulations. One result of his many hours of practising outdoors in frigid weather was that he developed the ability to perform card manipulations while wearing gloves. After being injured in battle, he continued to hone his magic skills in a hospital, convinced that practising sleight of hand would help him recover.

After an unsuccessful attempt to establish himself as a stage magician in British variety, he travelled to Australia, where he performed initially as Val Raymond before adopting the name Cardini. His new name advertised his mastery of card manipulation and paid homage to the most famous magician of the era, Houdini. Cardini wore a tuxedo, cape, top hat, and white gloves, and was billed as "The Suave Deceiver".

Cardini subsequently performed in Canada and then entered the United States from British Columbia. While working his way across the United States, he met Swan Walker in Chicago, who became his wife in 1927 and lifelong assistant. In New York City, Cardini became an almost immediate success, as audiences (and magicians) had never seen such an act. Cardini enhanced his performance by incorporating his magic tricks into a skit. Sleight of hand, gestures, and the appearance and disappearance of objects were all precisely timed to music.

He performed in New York at The Palace, Radio City Music Hall, Copacabana and other prominent nightclubs and reviews, and in London at the London Palladium. In 1933, he gave a Royal Variety Performance for King George V and Queen Mary. He worked with the Marx Brothers and Jack Benny, and performed for Al Capone, Franklin Roosevelt, and Harry Truman.

In 1945 he became president of the Magician's Guild, at the death of Theodore Hardeen.

In 1957 at the age of 62 he appeared on one of the few magic television shows broadcast at that time, Festival of Magic.

Cardini was a heavy smoker, suffered from peptic ulcers, and died from a stomach-related condition in November 1973 in Gardiner, New York.

== Legacy ==
The 2012 documentary Deceptive Practice includes archival footage and commentary on Cardini's career.

On 13 November 2013, 40 years after his death, Cardini was recognised by his grand-nephew and fellow magician, Randy Pitchford. Pitchford funded the development of a museum exhibit, in honor of Cardini, located at The Magic Castle in Hollywood, California. The exhibit can be found in the Inner Circle of the Magic Castle, where the Houdini exhibit was previously located. The exhibit showcases some of the most important artifacts from Cardini's act.

== Awards ==
Among his many acclamations was the New England Magic Society's proclamation of Cardini as the "greatest exponent of pure sleight of hand the world has ever known" (1958). He was honoured in 1970 with the title "Master Magician", which was awarded at the Magic Castle, Los Angeles, and presented by Tony Curtis. In 1999 he was named one of Magic Magazine's Top Magicians of the 20th Century. He served as president of the Society of American Magicians in 1941–1942. In 1960 The Magic Circle in London honoured him with the Silver Wand Award.
