= Learned pig =

1780s performing pig

The Learned Pig
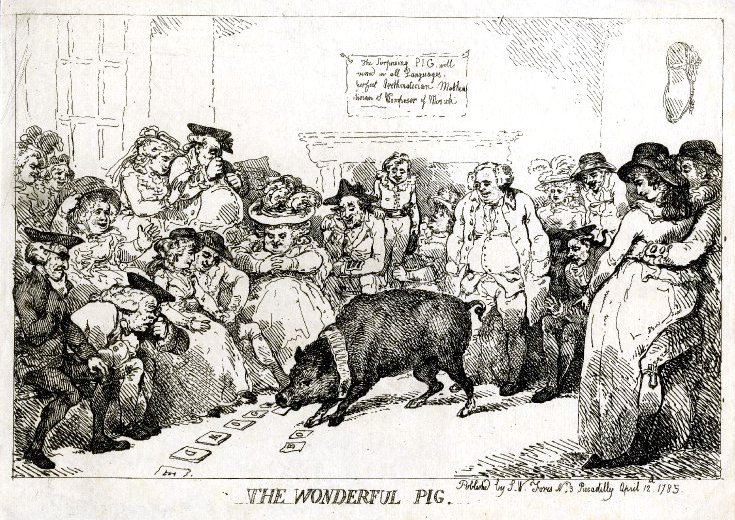
- Thomas Rowlandson's print The Wonderful Pig (1785) satirises the original "learned pig" of 1784-5.
- Other name: "Toby"
- Species: Sus scrofa domesticus
- Occupation: Exhibit; Entertainer
- Known for: Selecting cards to spell out names or numbers

The learned pig was a pig taught to respond to commands in such a way that it appeared to be able to answer questions by picking up cards in its mouth. By choosing cards it answered arithmetical problems and spelled out words. The "learned pig" caused a sensation in London during the 1780s. It became a common object of satire, illustrated caricature and a subject in popular literature.

The original "learned pig" was followed by other trained pigs, which subsequently became a feature of fairs and other public attractions in Europe and America during the 19th century. In the words of G.E. Bentley,

They served as subjects for cartoons by Rowlandson and moral essays in children's books and savage doggerel by Blake, and they illustrated the manners of the English in works by Joseph Strutt and Robert Southey and Thomas Hood. These freaks of learning clearly exercised a fascination among the literary geniuses of the age as they did among the swinish multitude.

== The original pig ==
The original "learned pig" was trained by a Scotsman, Samuel Bisset, who ran a travelling novelty show. The idea of an "intellectual" animal was not new. A similar attraction known as "Marocco the thinking horse" (c.1586–c.1606) had been exhibited over a century earlier; there were also contemporary examples of the "horse of knowledge", exhibited for example at Astley's Amphitheatre. But performing horses were nothing unusual. No performing pigs are known to have been trained before.

The pig was shown with great success in Dublin. After Bisset's death the pig was taken over by a Mr Nicholson, who toured it in Britain. It was exhibited in Nottingham in 1784, coming to London in the following year." According to publicity at the time,

This entertaining and sagacious animal casts accounts by means of Typographical cards, in the same manner as a Printer composes, and by the same method sets down any capital or Surname, reckons the number of People present, tells by evoking on a Gentleman's Watch in company what is the Hour and Minutes; he likewise tells any Lady's Thoughts in company, and distinguishes all sorts of colours.

The show was a great success, and the pig later toured the provincial towns, returning to London later in the year and then moving on to the continent of Europe. After a career of four years a report stated that the pig died in 1788. However, a later report claimed that it had just returned from France following the revolution of 1789, and was ready to "discourse on the Feudal System, the Rights of Kings and the Destruction of the Bastille".

The phenomenon caused much comment. James Boswell recalls conversations with Samuel Johnson in which he joked about the pig's scholarship. Johnson never saw the pig. He died just before it came to London, but he commented on a report of its show in Nottingham. He suggested that "the pigs are a race unjustly calumniated. Pig has, it seems, not been wanting to man, but man to pig. We do not allow time for his education, we kill him at a year old." Another man present joked that Alexander Pope would not have used the pig as a symbol of "the lowest degree of grovelling instinct" in his works if this creature had been known to him, but added that the pig had probably been subject to some form of torture to force it to respond to commands. Johnson replied that at least it had escaped slaughter: "the pig has no cause to complain; he would have been killed the first year if he had not been educated, and protracted existence is a good recompence for very considerable degrees of torture."

The discussion about how the pig had been trained also led to disputes about the cognitive abilities of pigs; whether the animal actually recognised letters or even words, or whether it was simply responding to direct prompting. The phenomenon was also discussed in instructional literature aimed at children, to describe the essential difference between human and animal capacities and to warn against cruelty to animals, on the assumption that the pigs were badly beaten by their trainers to force them to behave. Mrs Trimmer in her children's book The Robin Redbreasts (1788), "designed to teach children the proper treatment of animals", mentions the pig in chapter entitled "The Cruel Boy": aiming to teach that animals are not "mere machines, actuated by the unerring hand of Providence", it says that the sight of the Learned Pig, "which has lately been shown in London, has deranged these ideas, and I know not what think".

== Later pigs ==
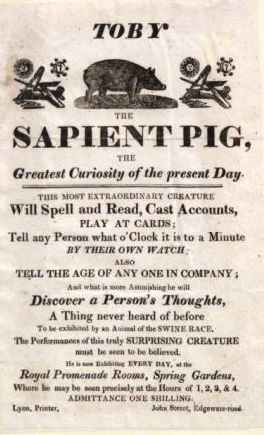
Poster for Toby the Sapient Pig

In 1798 a learned pig appeared in the United States. William Frederick Pinchbeck displayed a "Pig of Knowledge" in New England. He claimed to have toured all the major towns of the Union and introduced the pig to President John Adams, to "universal applause". Pinchbeck later explained his methods of training the pig in a pamphlet. He denied that any form of torture was involved, insisting that it was better to "coax" the pig to follow instructions. The animal would soon learn to respond to the slightest hints of movement from the trainer. He stated that credulous spectators accused him of using witchcraft, one stating that "his performances were the effects of the Black Art; that the Pig ought to be burnt, and the Man banished, as he had no doubt but...[his trainer] familiarly corresponded with the devil." Others suggested that the pig was evidence of reincarnation: "the spirit of the grunting philosopher might once have animated a man."

In the early 19th century, Nicholas Hoare, an illusionist, exhibited "Toby the sapient pig" in London. Toby could "discover a person's thoughts", a skill "never heard of before to be exhibited by an animal of the swine race". Around 1817 Toby also published an autobiography, The life and adventures of Toby, the sapient pig: with his opinions on men and manners. Written by himself.

A pig owned by Pinchbeck was shown in London between 1818 and 1823. According to his publicity, the pig had acquired his wisdom from "Souchanguyee, the Chinese Philosopher." He answered questions by "pointing to cards, letters, and persons in the audience."

"Toby" became a standard name for a learned pig. The writer Harrison Weir depicts a learned pig called Toby, which he saw a "year ago at Camberwell Fair" for a penny. According to Harrison, the pig carried a correctly numbered card to a person who had called out a number; it spelled "vittels," and then it left to have some, "with a joyful grunt, and the show was over."

== Caricature ==
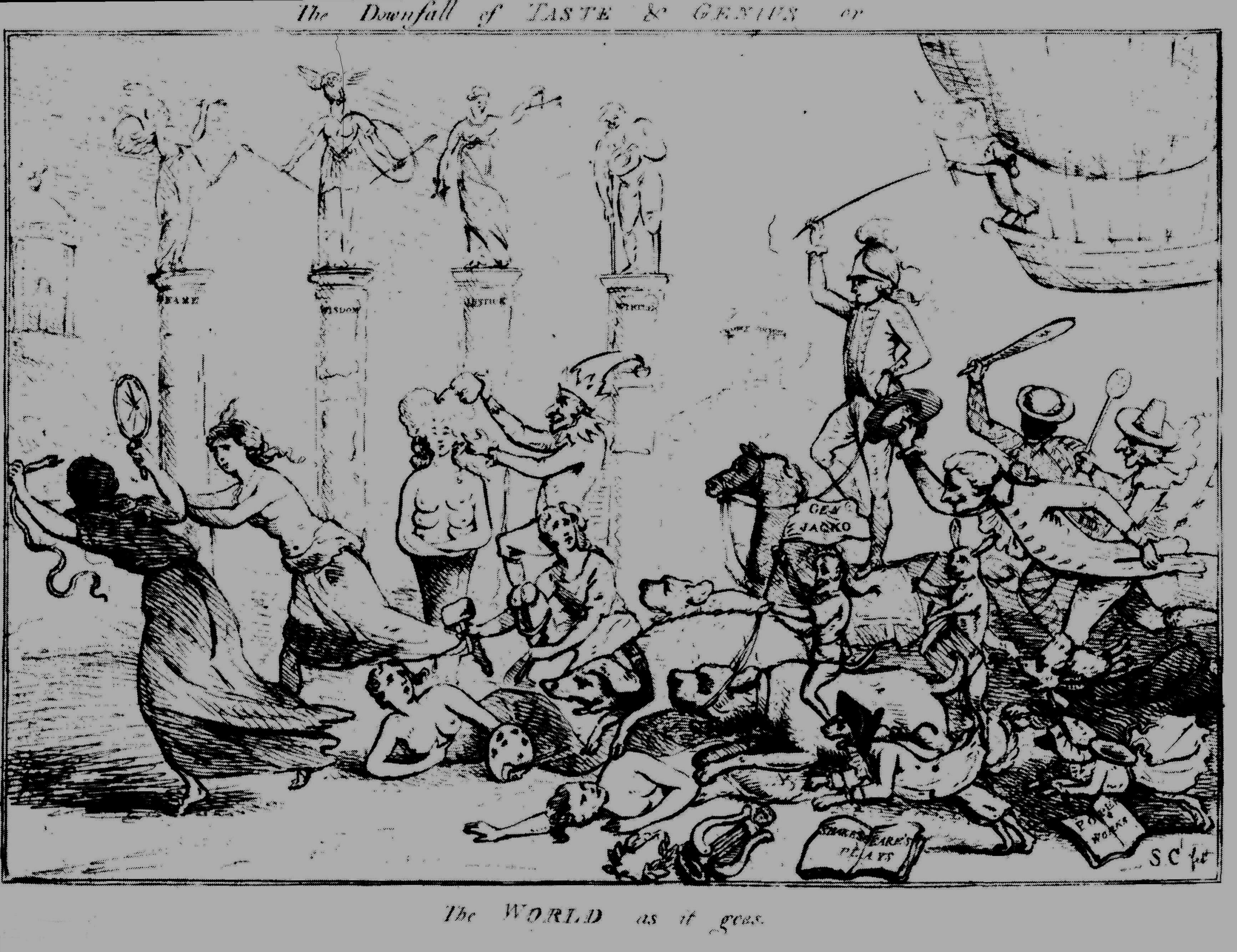
The Downfall of Taste and Genius (1784). The classical muses flee while the Learned Pig leads an assault on the arts, as Shakespeare's and Pope's works are cast aside.

The original learned pig inspired a large number of satirical comments and comic prints. Thomas Rowlandson published a caricature of "The Wonderful Pig" in 1785, in which the pig is shown displaying his erudition to a crowd of amazed ladies and gentlemen. A placard states "The Surprising PIG well versed in all Languages, perfect Arethmatician Mathematician & Composer of Musick."

Other caricatures used the appeal of the pig to poke fun at theatrical fads of the day. The Theatrical War satirises the actor-impresario John Palmer, dressed in Shakespearean costume, being threatened by other attractions including the pig.

The 1784 print The Downfall of Taste and Genius, or, The World As it Goes by Samuel Collings ridicules "the taste that prefers the Dancing Dogs, the Learned Pig, and Harlequin to Shakespeare". This was a "recurrent theme" of prints at the time. The print depicts the pig leading a procession of performing animals who knock over figures representing the fine arts while copies of Shakespeare's and Pope's works are trampled underfoot by the animals.

An anonymous print entitled "The Wonderful Pig of Knowledge" shows a pig performing in a parlour apparently engaged in spelling the word "PORC[INE]"

Politicians were also satirised by being compared to the pig. William Pitt was referred to as "the Wonderful Pig" on several occasions. One satirical print showed Pitt with the body of a pig; the caption asserted that among his powers was the ability to explain recent Acts of Parliament, a feat "before never having been even attempted in these our realms!!!" In one print Pitt and his opponent Charles James Fox were both depicted as competing learned pigs.

== Literature ==
The concept of the "learned pig" became a common motif in satirical literature by the late 18th century, playing on the implied contrast between gross physicality and intellectual superiority. The poet William Cowper lamented that his fame had been unfavourably compared to both the pig and a "prostitute" (the notoriously promiscuous actress George Anne Bellamy). A poem published in 1785 referred to the fact that the pig had arrived in London just after Johnson's death,

Though Johnson, learned Bear, is gone,
Let us no longer mourn our loss,
For lo, a learned Hog is come,
And wisdom grunts at Charing Cross.

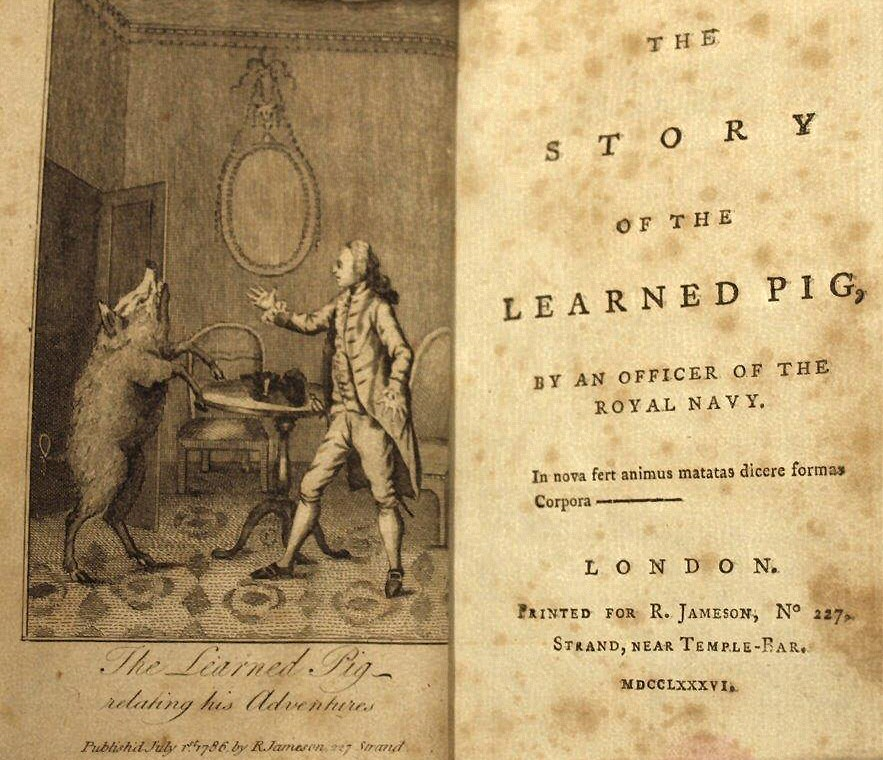
The Story of the Learned Pig by an Officer of the Royal Navy, 1786

The anonymous pamphlet The Story of the Learned Pig, By an officer of the Royal Navy (1786), the author using the pseudonym Transmigratus, picked up the theme of reincarnation. This presents itself as the personal reminiscences of the pig, as told to the author. He describes himself as a soul that has successively migrated from the body of Romulus into various humans and animals before becoming the Learned Pig. He recalls his previous incarnations. After Romulus he became Brutus, and then entered several human and animal bodies. Adapting the Shakespeare theme, the pamphlet states that he became a man called "Pimping Billy", who worked as a horse-holder at a playhouse with Shakespeare and was the real author of his plays. He then became a famous British aristocrat and general — identified only by asterisks — before entering the body of a pig.

Puns on the name "Bacon", referring to the philosopher Francis Bacon, also appeared in the literature. In the poem "The Prophetic Pig", in The Whim of the Day (c.1794) a believer in reincarnation states, "I can easily trace...A metempsychosis in this pig's face!...And in transmigration, if I'm not mistaken,/This learned pig must be, by consanguinity,/Descended from the great Lord Bacon." Thomas Hood's poem The Lament of Toby, The Learned Pig also uses the Bacon pun, adding another on the poet James Hogg. He describes the thoughts of a learned pig forced to retire from his intellectual pursuits to be fattened for slaughter. The pig says "Goodbye to the poetic Hogg!/The philosophic Bacon!":

In this world, pigs, as well as men,
Must dance to fortune's fiddlings,
But must I give the classics up,
For barley-meal and middlings?

William Blake attacked debased public taste in a poem (c. 1808-11) dedicated to the artist James Barry, writing that the nation which neglected Barry might "give pensions to the Learned Pig / Or the Hare playing on a Tabor". He also alludes to it in his 1784 satire An Island in the Moon. In 1807 Robert Southey parodied the contrast between real genius and meretricious celebrity by referring to the pig, noting that "the learned pig was in his day a far greater object of admiration to the English nation than ever was Sir Isaac Newton." William Wordsworth refers to the pig in The Prelude, describing it as one of the "freaks of nature" to be seen at Bartholomew Fair:

...Albinos, painted Indians, Dwarfs,
The Horse of knowledge, and the learned Pig
All out-o'-the-way, far-fetched, perverted things,
All freaks of nature, all Promethean thoughts
Of man, his dulness, madness, and their feats
All jumbled up together, to compose
A Parliament of Monsters.

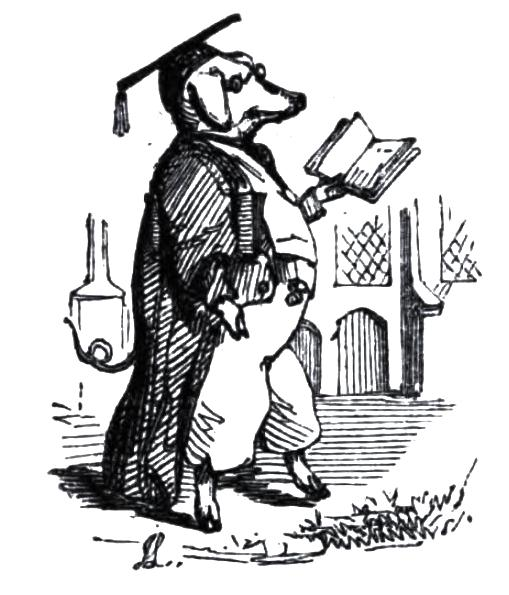
Toby learning Latin grammar, a caricature by John Leech, 1840s

The pig continued to be a common reference point for writers such as Mary Wollstonecraft and Charles Dickens. In the 1837-8 The Mudfog Papers Dickens describes a moving lecture given at the Mudfog Society for the Advancement of Everything by Mr Blunderum on the dying moments of the learned pig. The lecturer was asked whether the learned pig was related to the Pig-faced Lady, causing embarrassment to an audience member who was related to the lady, but who refused to admit a family connection to the learned pig.

Mrs Beeton begins her recipe for cooking sucking pig, from her 1861 bestseller Mrs Beeton's Book of Household Management, with the observation that pigs are capable of "education" "and though, like the ass, naturally stubborn and obstinate, that he is equally amenable with other animals to caresses and kindness". This is proven by "the instance of the learned pig, first exhibited about a century since, but which has been continued down to our own time by repeated instances of an animal who will put together all the letters or figures that compose the day, month, hour and date of the exhibition, besides many other unquestioned evidences of memory."

Most recently, the "Learned Pig" has made a reappearance of sorts in popular culture; in 2003 he was the subject of a song, "The Learned Pig," which was part of a concept concert and recording by the UK band the Tiger Lillies, based on a poem by Edward Gorey. The musical "Toby the Incredible Learned Pig", written by Daniel Freedman, was a finalist in the Wonderland One Act Festival at Theater Works 42nd St. NYC in 2007. In 2011 there appeared a novel, Pyg: The Memoirs of a Learned Pig, by Russell Potter, based on the career of the original "Toby". (ISBN 0857862405)

== See also ==
- List of individual pigs
- Learned Pigs & Fireproof Women
- Category:Trick horses
