= Learned Pigs & Fireproof Women =

- Author: Ricky Jay
- Genre: Theatre
- Publisher: Villard Books; Farrar, Straus and Giroux
- Publication date: 1986, 1998
- Pages: 343
- ISBN: 978-0-374-52570-5
- Dewey Decimal: 790.20922, 791.0922

Learned Pigs & Fireproof Women is a book written by stage magician, actor and writer Ricky Jay. Divided into numerous themed chapters, the book provides the bizarre histories of some of the world's most eccentric entertainers, ranging from mind readers and daredevils to animal handlers and stone eaters. Jay presents all of his subjects within their historical contexts and provides numerous illustrations and posters alongside his text.

Some examples of the entertainers included in Jay's book:

- The learned pig of the title, a pig that could spell, calculate and read minds.
- Joseph Pujol, also known as Le Petomane, the master flatulist.
- Max Malini, the illusionist famous for his audacity and his tricks involving unsuspecting celebrities.
- Leon Rauch, also known as LaRoche, the Sisyphus of the circus world.
- Ivan Ivanitz Chabert, the "Human Salamander" and "Really Incombustible Phenomenon".

First published in 1986 by Villard Books, the book is currently out of print.

== Adaptations ==
A 1989 television special of the same name was created based on Jay's book. The show featured a variety of magic tricks, stunts and performances, such as a musical performance on wine glasses and an antique acrobatic clockwork doll.

== Reception ==
The title of the book was considered irresistibly tempting by Richard Goodman, who cited it as an example in his work on creative writing.

John Gross reviewed it for The New York Times. He found it to be excellent, being well researched, having a good range of exotic examples and being well-written with good humour.

== Pop culture ==
In the 1999 film Magnolia, a boy is reading in the library, and the book is seen amongst the volumes the boy has chosen to read. Jay himself appears in the movie, in a supporting role.
