= Deceptive Practice: The Mysteries and Mentors of Ricky Jay =

- Directed by: Molly Bernstein
- Starring: Ricky Jay
- Release date: 2012
- Country: United States
- Language: English

Deceptive Practice: The Mysteries and Mentors of Ricky Jay is an American 2012 documentary film about the magician Ricky Jay, and is directed by Molly Bernstein.

== Summary ==
The film offers perspective into how Jay's mentors (and fellow magical mentors) including Cardini, Dai Vernon and Charlie Miller affected his development as a magician.
