= Julien J. Proskauer =

American magician

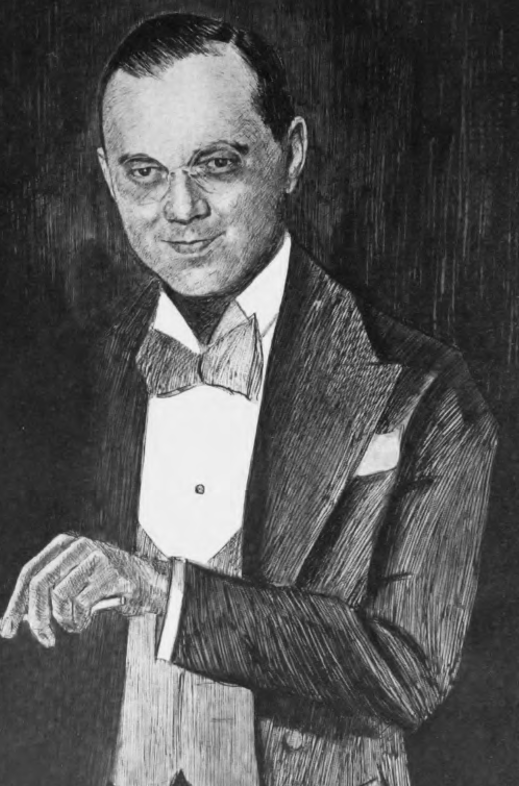
- Born: June 14, 1893; New York City
- Died: December 8, 1958 (aged 65)
- Resting place: New York City
- Occupations: Magician, author

Julien Joseph Proskauer (June 14, 1893 – December 18, 1958) was an American magician and author.

Proskauer was born June 14, 1893, to Joseph Proskauer and Bertha Richman Proskauer in New York City. He was a friend of Harry Houdini and was well known for debunking fraud mediums. His book The Dead Do Not Talk (1946) exposed the fakes, frauds and tricks in spiritualism.

He was the president of the Society of American Magicians (1935–1936). He was a contributor to many magazines and journals on magic.

He died December 18, 1958, and is buried in New York.

== Publications ==
- The Dead Do Not Talk (1946)
- Fun at Cocktail Time (1938)
- Suckers All! (1934)
- How'd ja do That? (1934)
- What'll You Have? A Not Too Dry Text Book About Cocktails (1933)
- Spook Crooks! (1932)
