= List of Greek Americans =

The following is a list of notable Greek Americans, including both original immigrants of full or partial Greek descent who obtained American citizenship and their American descendants.

== Architecture ==
- George J. Efstathiou – architect
- Costas Kondylis – architect
- Nicholas Negroponte – architect and computer scientist

== Business ==
=== Automobiles ===
- Elena Ford – Ford Motor Company heiress and officer

=== Agriculture ===
- Peter J. Taggares

=== Alcoholic beverages ===
- C. Dean Metropoulos – owner of Pabst Brewing Company

=== Chemicals and petroleum ===
- Andrew N. Liveris – CEO of Dow Chemical Company
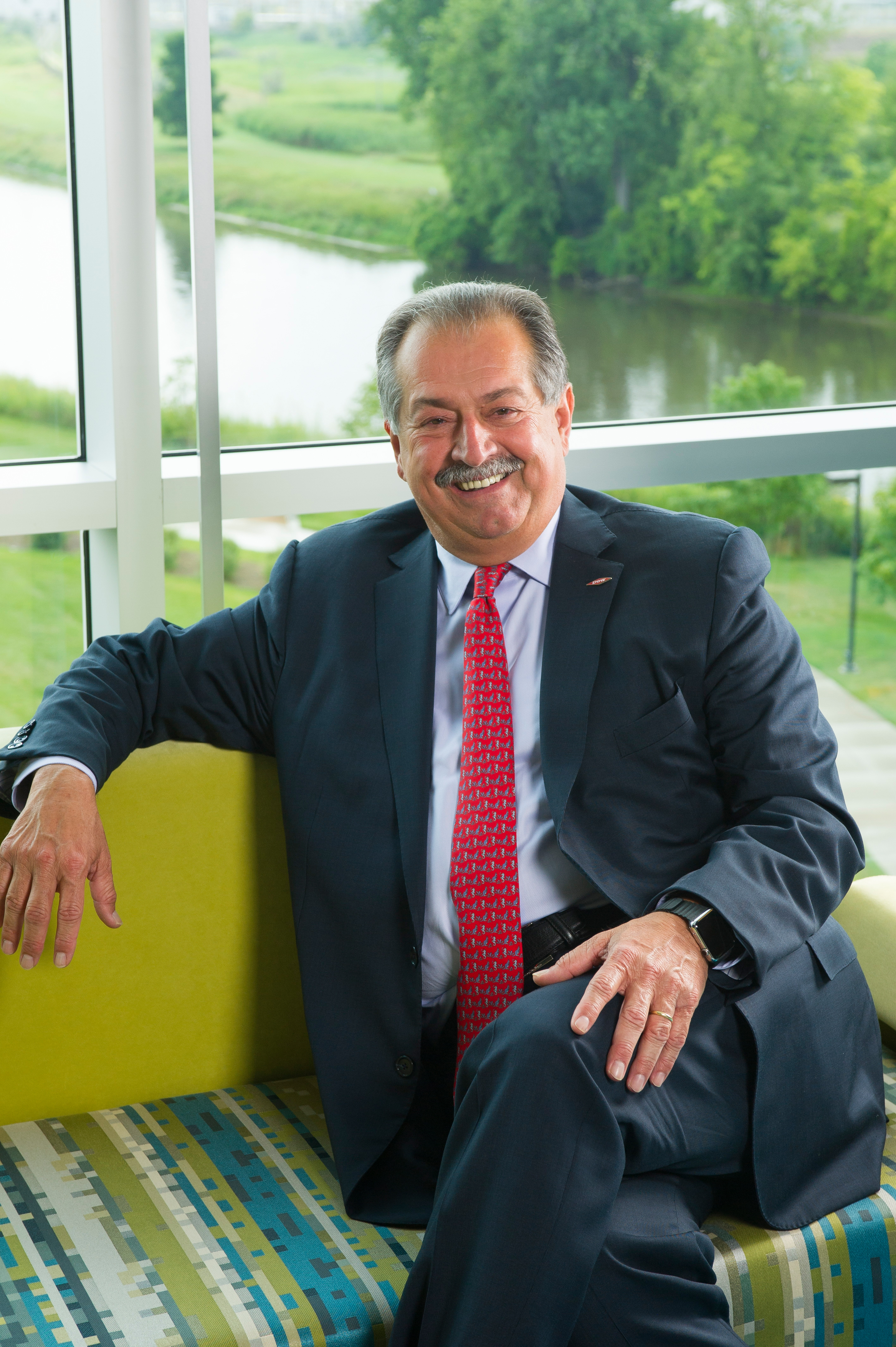
  Andrew Liveris CEO of Dow Chemical Company
- William S. Stavropoulos – past CEO and Chairman of The Dow Chemical Company
- William Tavoulareas – president of Mobil Oil Corporation
- Van Vlahakis – founder of Earth Friendly Products

=== Computer software and hardware ===
- Michael Capellas – terminal CEO of MCI and Compaq
- Greg Papadopoulos – senior vice president and chief technical officer of Sun Microsystems Inc.
- Stratton Sclavos – president & CEO of VeriSign
- Ed Zander – CEO of Motorola and former president of Sun Microsystems
- George Perlegos - Computer scientist and engineer. Founder and former CEO of ATMEL
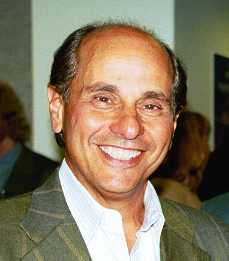
  Ed Zander CEO of Motorola

=== Consumer products ===
- John Paul DeJoria – cofounder of the Paul Mitchell line of hair products
- Tom Kartsotis – founder of Fossil Group and Shinola Detroit
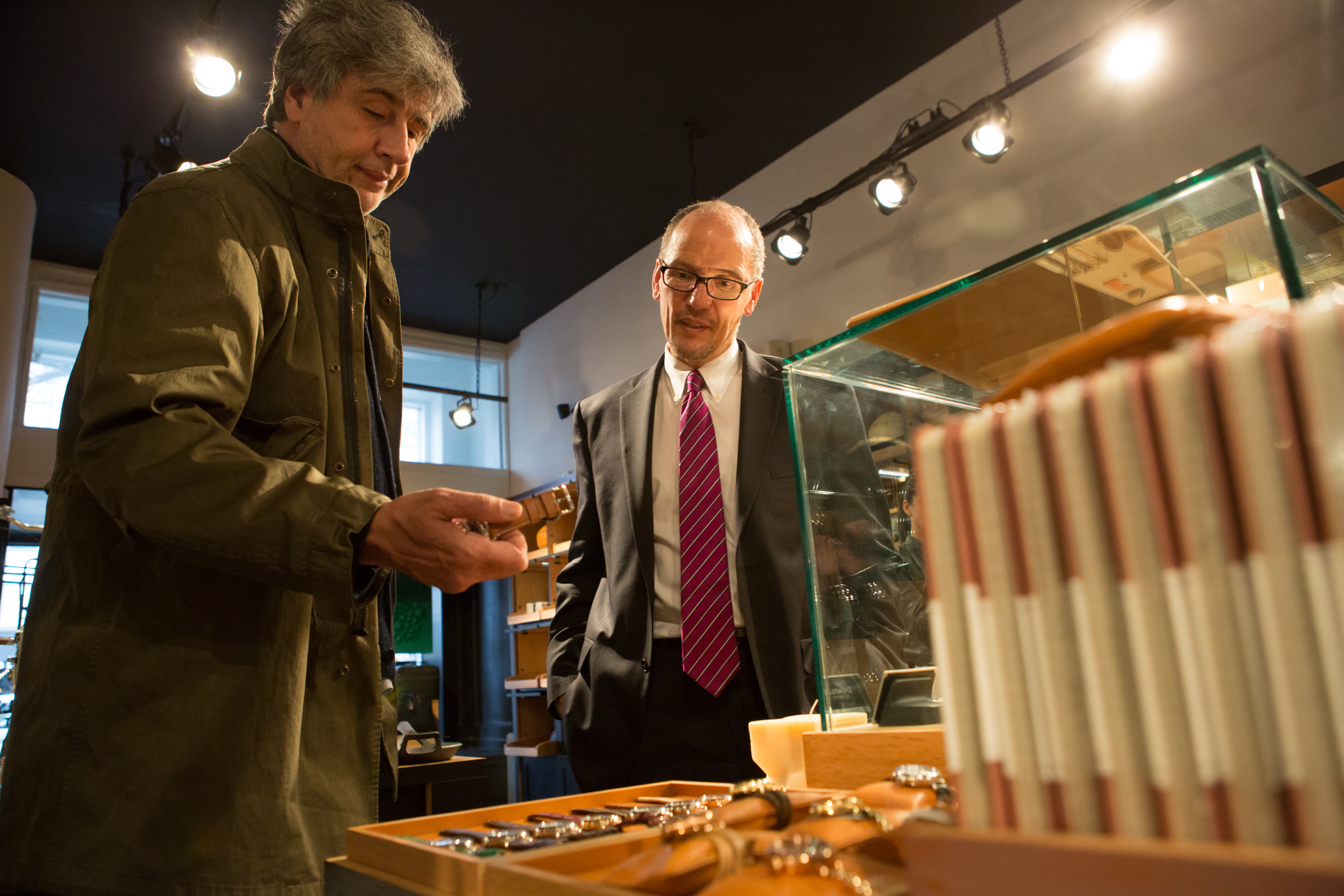
  Tom Kartsotis, founder of Fossil Group meeting with then Secretary of Labor Tom Perez
- Leo Stefanos – inventor of the Dove Bar

=== Education ===
- John Brademas – president of New York University
- Peter Diamandopoulos – president of Adelphi University
- Linda P.B. Katehi-Tseregounis – chancellor of the University of California, Davis
- Constantine Papadakis – president of Drexel University
- Paul Vallas – CEO of the Chicago Public Schools

=== Entertainment and media ===
- Akim Anastopoulo – Featured judge on Eye for an Eye. Executive producer of Crackle’s Men of West Hollywood; co-owner of the series’ production company, Get Me Out Productions.
- Kary Antholis – senior vice president for miniseries at HBO
- John P. Avlon, author, political commentator, CNN Senior Political Analyst and former Editor-in-Chief of The Daily Beast
- Nickolas Davatzes – retired president and CEO of A&E Television Networks
- Jim Gianopoulos – chairman and CEO of Paramount Pictures
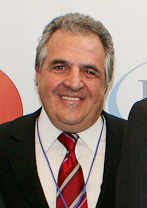
  Jim Gianopoulos CEO of Paramount Pictures
- George Kerasotes – one of the founders of Kerasotes Theatres, and United Theatre Owners of Illinois in 1947.
- Oren Koules – entrepreneur, film producer, and professional sports executive
- Alexander Pantages – vaudeville and early motion picture producer and impresario
- Ted Sarandos – chief content officer for Netflix
- Charles Skouras – movie magnate, president of Fox Coast West and National Pictures
- George Skouras – movie magnate, president of United Artists
- Spyros Skouras – movie magnate, president of 20th Century Fox
- George Lois – advertising executive (ESPN, USA Today, Xerox, MTV, Wolfschmidt, Tommy Hilfiger), "Fizz Fizz What a Relief it Is", "No Dancing in the (a)Isles" "Crazy People" (Big break hired by Rossides for Javits 1960)
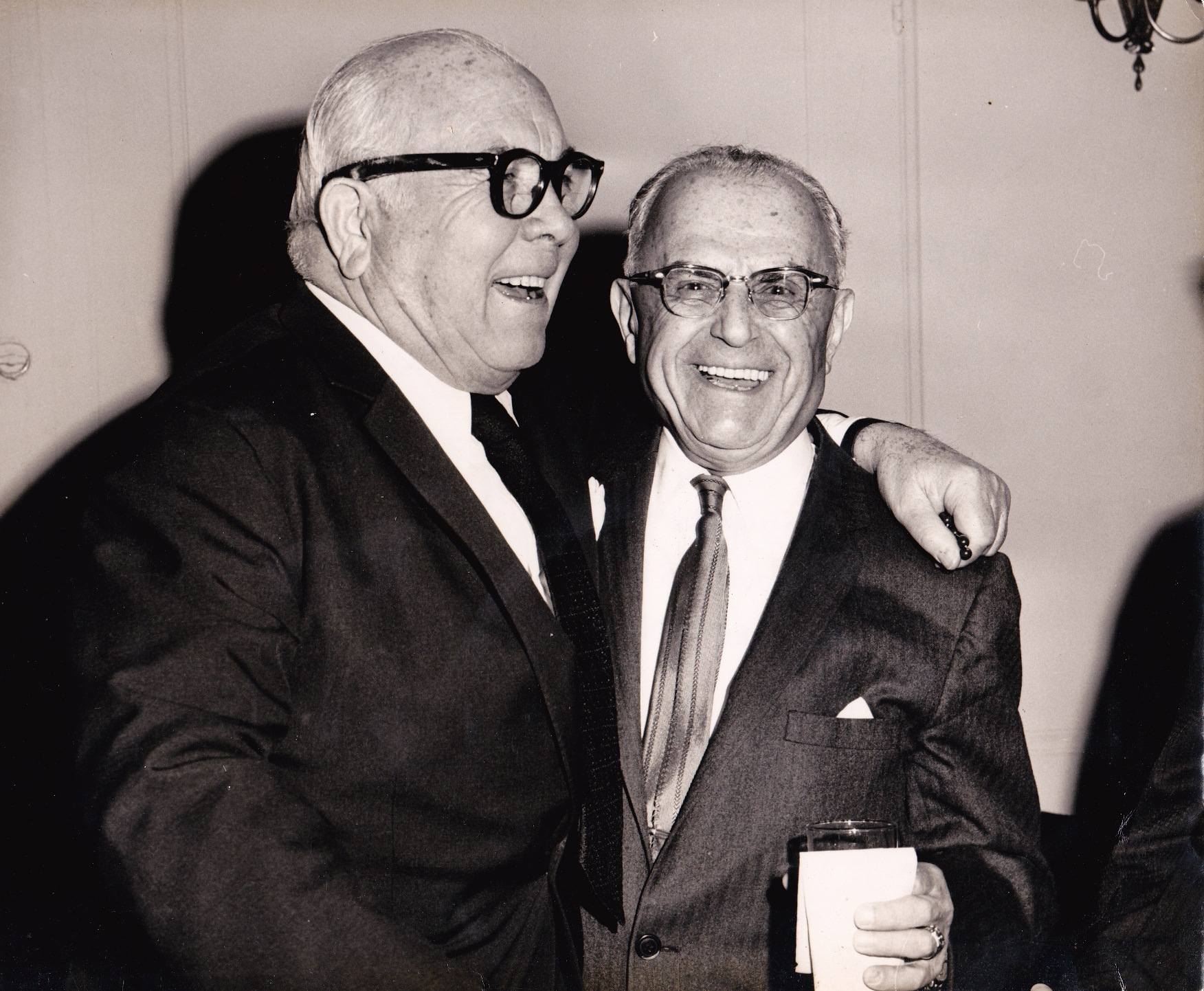
  Spyros Skouras, president of 20th Century Fox from 1942 to 1962

=== Finance and venture capital ===
- Peter Barris – American venture capitalist, FDA
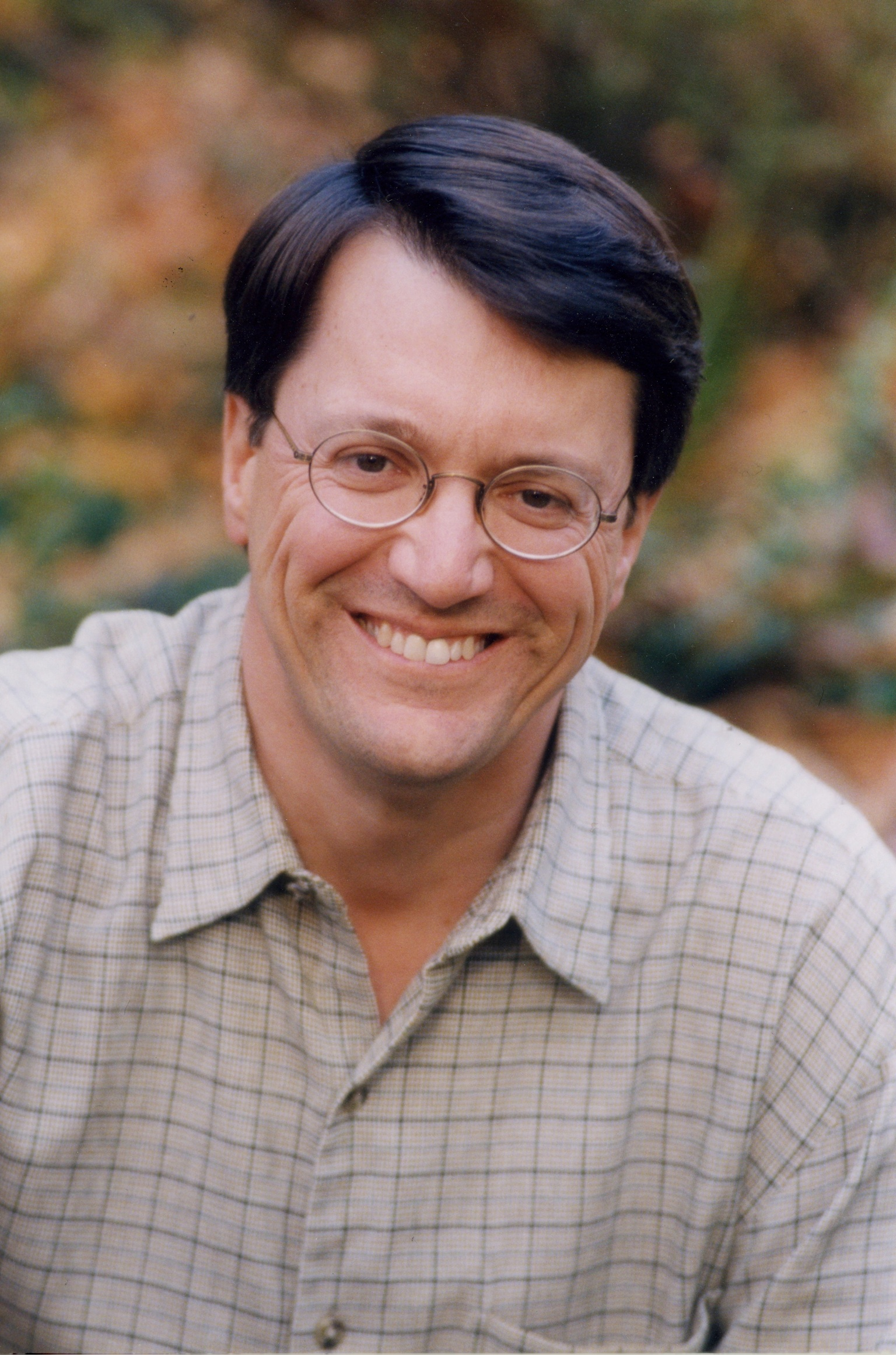
  Peter Barris Greek-American venture capitalist, known for launching Groupon and CareerBuilder
- Zoe Cruz – ex co-president of Morgan Stanley
- Jamie Dimon – (Papademetriou) - CEO of JPMorgan Chase, grandson of Smyrna broker
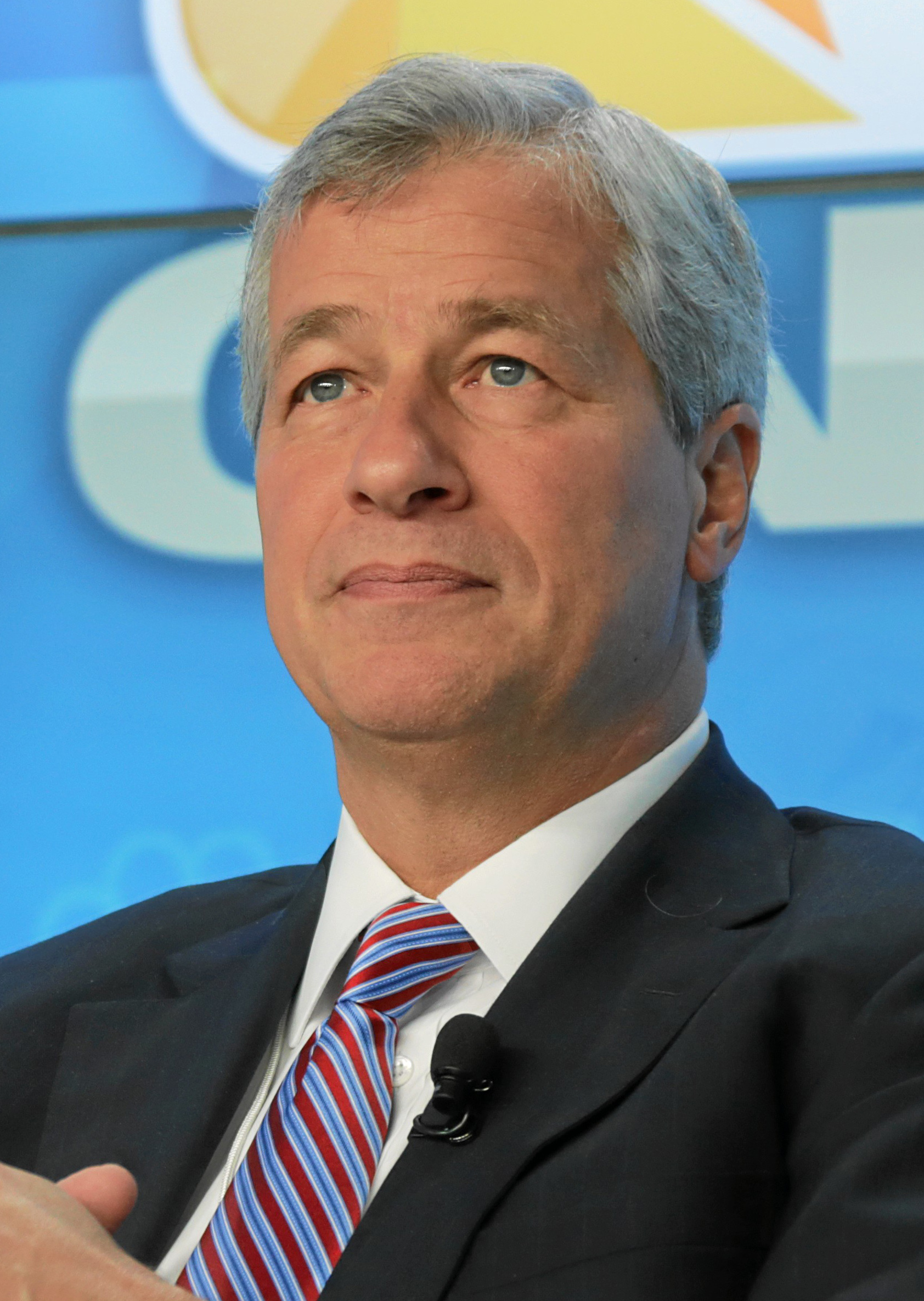
  Jamie Dimon, CEO of JPMorgan Chase
- John Calamos – founder of Calamos Investments
- Peter Peterson (Petropoulos) - ex-CEO of Bell & Howell, Lehman Bros, chair of Council on Foreign Relations, chair BlackStone, Nixon Commerce Scy
- William Spell – founder and current president of Spell Capital Partners
- Mike Vranos – hedge fund manager
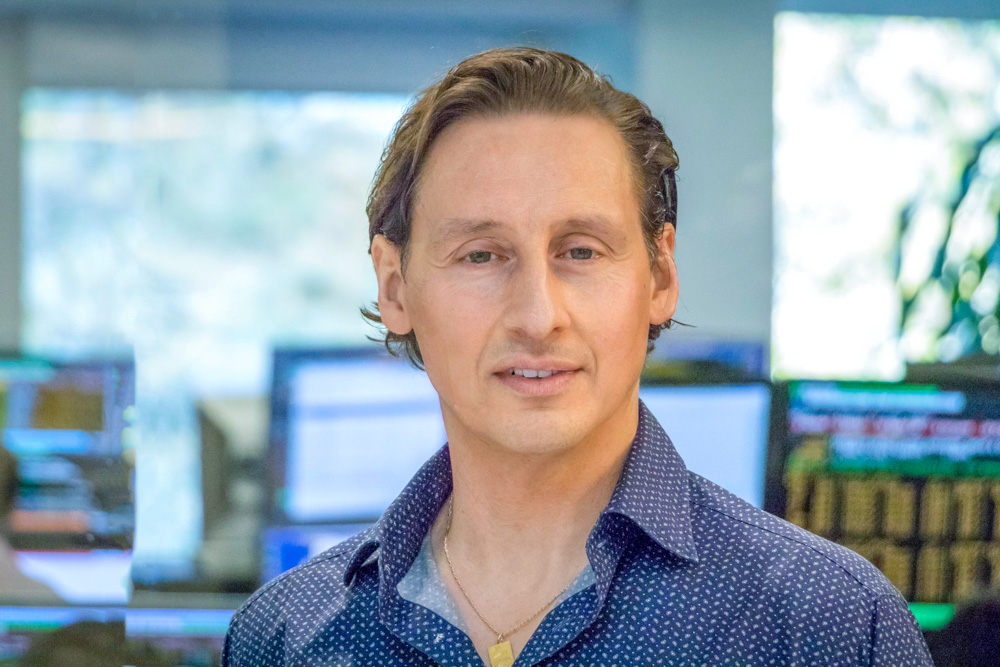
  Mike Vranos Hedge fund manager for Kidder, Peabody & Co.
- Harry Wilson – former investor and restructuring expert
- Jim Chanos - founder and president of Kynikos Associates

=== Game design ===
- Alex Rigopulos – video game designer, cofounder of Harmonix Music Systems

=== Inventor ===
- George Ballas – inventor of the weed eater, father of dancer Corky Ballas and grandfather to dancer Mark Ballas

=== Medical devices and pharmaceuticals ===
- Peter M. Nicholas – cofounder of Boston Scientific Corporation
- P. Roy Vagelos – M.D. and former chairman and CEO of Merck
- Albert Bourla - Ph.D. CEO of Pfizer

=== Retail ===
- Sophia Amoruso – founder and owner of Nasty Gal
- John Catsimatidis – founder of Gristedes Foods
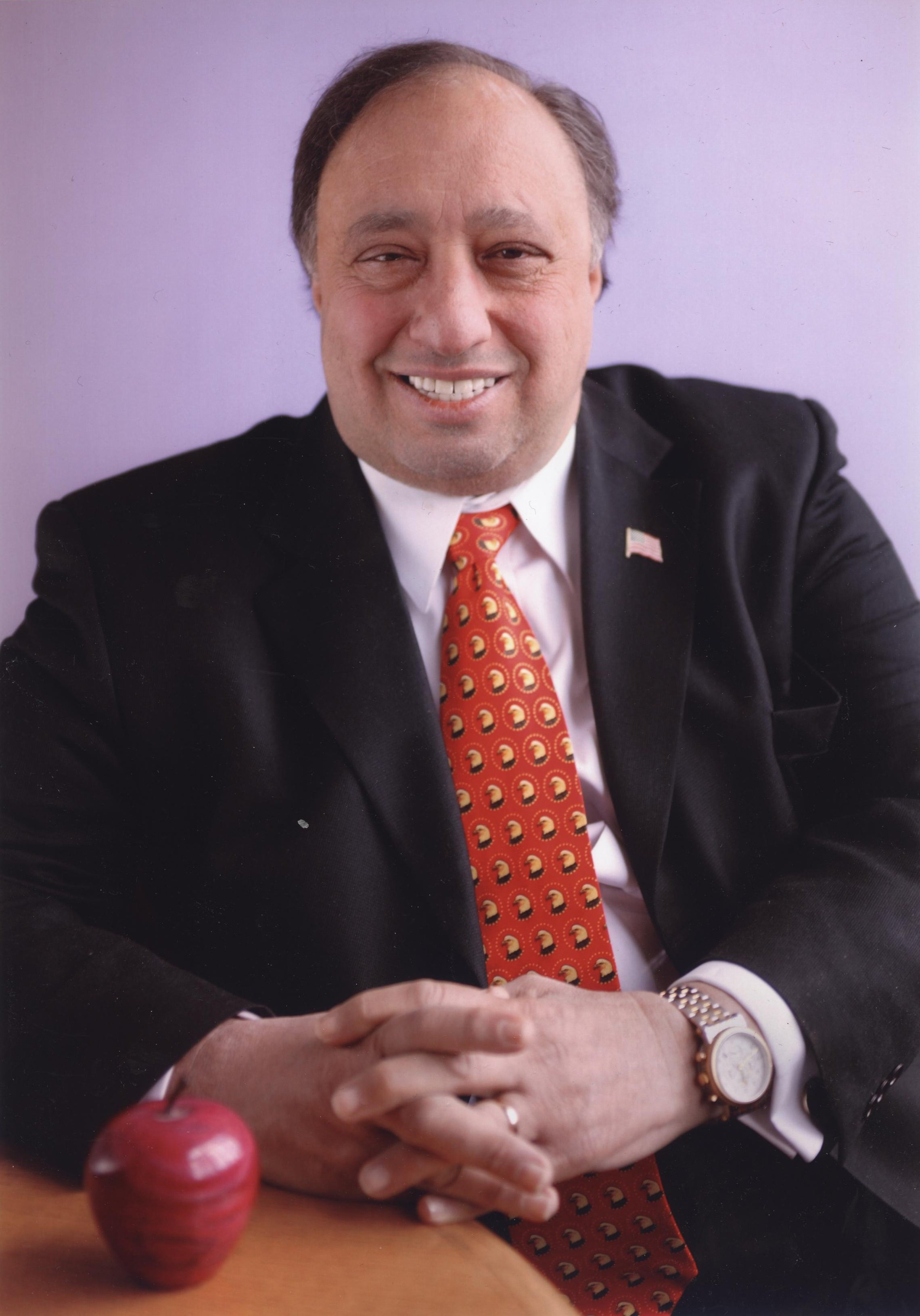
  John Catsimatidis Billionaire businessman and Republican primary challenger for New York City mayoral election, 2013
- Tom Carvel – founder of the Carvel franchise
- The Demoulas Brothers – founders of the DeMoulas' Market Basket

=== Real estate ===
- George Argyros – founder of real estate company Amel & Affiliates
- Sam Israel – investor and landlord
- George Lycurgus – developer of hotels on Waikiki and the Volcano House
- George P. Mitchell – original developer of the Woodlands
- Alex Spanos – California realty magnate, chaired American Bible Society

=== Social media ===
- Jason Calacanis – angel investor (Uber), entrepreneur and founder of Weblogs, Inc.
- Arianna Huffington – founder of Huffington Post
- Alyssa LaRoche – founder of Aimee Weber Studio Inc.
- Ted Leonsis – vice-chair of AOL
- Angelo Sotira – cofounder of the online community DeviantArt
- Gregg Spiridellis – cofounder of JibJab
- Evan Spiridellis – cofounder of JibJab

=== Sports ===
- Peter Angelos – MLB owner of the Baltimore Orioles and former basketball player. Successful product-liability case lawyer.
- Alex Anthopoulos – (May 25, 1977) Canadian-born baseball executive. Currently GM and EVP of Atlanta Braves. Formerly GM and SVP of Toronto Blue Jays.
- Alex Spanos – Deceased. Was owner of NFL's San Diego Chargers.
- Dean Spanos – President and CEO of San Diego Chargers. Son of Alex Spanos.
- A. G. Spanos – President of Business Operations of San Diego Chargers. Grandson of Alex Spanos.
- Peter Karmanos Jr. – founder, president & CEO of Compuware and owner of the NHL team Carolina Hurricanes
- Ted Phillips – president and CEO of the NFL team the Chicago Bears
- Ted Leonsis – founder, chairman, and CEO of Monumental Sports & Entertainment
- Tom Gores – Billionaire, businessman, investor.

=== Various ===
- Jim Davis – chairman of New Balance
- Peter Diamandis – magazine entrepreneur, founder of the International Space University
- Emmanuel Kampouris – businessman and philanthropist; former chairman and CEO of American Standard Companies
- Prince Alexander von Fürstenberg – businessman and philanthropist
- Michael Recanati – businessman and philanthropist
- George Logothetis – founder and CEO of the Libra Group
- Harry Markopoulos – forensic accounting and financial fraud investigator; Madoff investment scandal whistleblower
- John Rigas – founder of Adelphia Communications Corporation
- John Sitilides – government affairs and international relations specialist at Trilogy Advisors LLC in Washington, D.C.

=== Fashion ===
==== Cuisine ====
- Cat Cora – Iron Chef on Food Network's Iron Chef America
- Marisa Churchill – known for Top Chef (season 2), author of the Sweet & Skinny cookbooks, Food Network Challenge, and host of My Sweet & Skinny Life on Alpha channel in Greece.
- George Mavrothalassitis – chef and restaurateur known as one of the cofounders of Hawaii Regional Cuisine in the early 1990s
- Spike Mendelsohn – chef and restaurateur best known as the fifth-place finisher of the fourth season of Top Chef (2008–2009)
- Michael Psilakis – restaurateur best known for his appearances on television shows including Ultimate Recipe Showdown, Iron Chef America, The Best Thing I Ever Ate and No Kitchen Required
- Michele Ragussis – chef, best known as a finalist on the Food Network series Food Network Star (season 8)
- Nicholas Stefanelli – chef and restaurateur, known for his Michelin-starred Italian restaurant Masseria
- Michael Symon – Iron Chef on Food Network's Iron Chef America

==== Fashion ====
- Michael Costello – fashion designer
- Patricia Field – fashion designer
- James Galanos – fashion designer
- Peter Speliopoulos – vice president, DKNY design
- George Stavropoulos – fashion designer
- John Varvatos – fashion designer
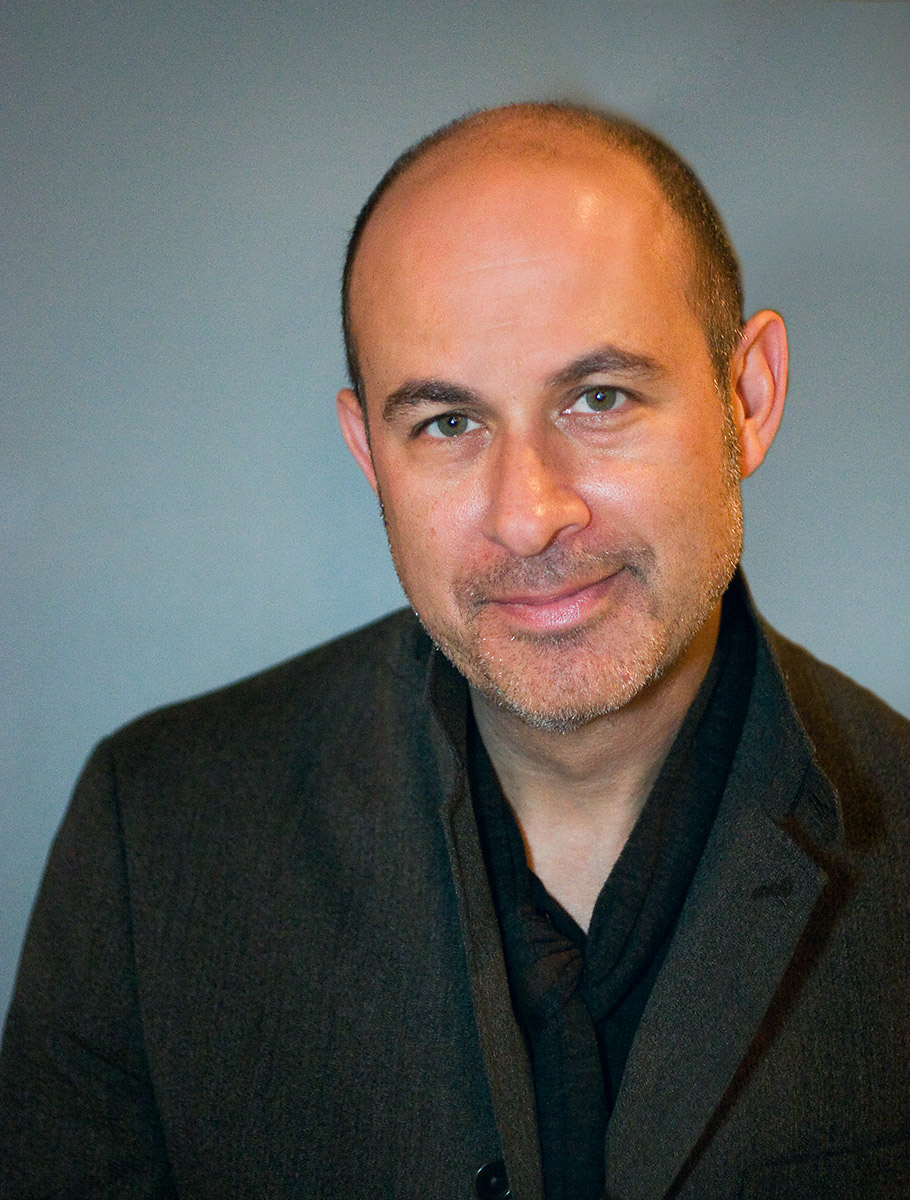
  John Varvatos Founder and designer of John Varvatos (company)
- Nick Verreos – American fashion designer

==== Modeling ====
- Betty Cantrell – beauty pageant titleholder, Miss Georgia 2015 & Miss America 2016
- Margia Dean – former American beauty queen and actress, Miss California 1939
- Ella Halikas – model, social media influencer
- Patricia Kara – model, actress, TV personality
- Katerina Katakalides – model and beauty pageant titleholder (Teen Miss New York 2016)
- Cleo Maletis – beauty pageant titleholder
- Becky and Jessie O'Donohue – American Idol contestants and models,
- Ryan Pinkston – actor and model
- Suzi Simpson – model, actress, aspiring screenwriter
- Jessica St. George – Playboy magazine Playmate of the Month (February 1965)
- Corinna Tsopei – Miss Universe 1964 - American actress
- Sofia Richie Lionel's Richie daughter

==== Style ====
- Vidal Sassoon – British and American hairstylist

== Explorers and settlers ==
- Pete Athans – mountaineer
- Yiorgos Caralambo – one of the eight men hired by US Army in 1856 to lead the camel driver experiment in the Southwest.
- John Cocoris – introduced the technique of sponge diving in 1905 to Tarpon Springs by recruiting divers and crew members from Greece. The first divers came from the Saronic Gulf islands of Aegina and Hydra, but they were soon outnumbered by those from the Dodecanese islands of Kalymnos, Symi and Halki.
- Philip Tedro, or Hadji Ali - hired by US Army in 1856 to lead the camel driver experiment in the Southwest.
- Gracia Dura Bin – early settler, wife of Dr. Andrew Turnbull

== Religious figures ==
- Andrew Constantinides Zenos (1855–1942) Presbyterian minister, author, and dean of McCormick Theological Seminary
- Archbishop Iakovos – former Greek Orthodox Archbishop of America, Harvard professor, Selma marcher, president World Council of Churches
- Aryeh Kaplan – American Orthodox rabbi of Greek-Sephardic descent from Thessaloniki
- Eric Metaxas – author, essayist and biographer of Martin Luther, Dietrich Bonhoeffer and William Wilberforce
- Betty Robbins – second Jewish female cantor in history

== Law ==
- Peter Angelos – product-liability case lawyer, owner of the MLB Baltimore Orioles and former basketball player.
- Stephanos Bibas – United States circuit judge for the United States Court of Appeals for the Third Circuit
- James C. Cacheris – senior United States district judge for the United States District Court for the Eastern District of Virginia
- Michael Chagares – federal judge on the United States Court of Appeals for the Third Circuit
- Constantine George Cholakis – former United States federal judge
- William P. Dimitrouleas – United States federal judge of the United States District Court for the Southern District of Florida
- Peter C. Economus – United States federal judge on the United States District Court for the Northern District of Ohio
- Maria Foscarinis – founder and executive director, National Law Center on Homelessness & Poverty
- Nicholas Garaufis – senior United States district judge serving on the United States District Court for the Eastern District of New York
- Constandinos Himonas – justice of the Utah Supreme Court
- Kenneth M. Karas – United States district judge of the United States District Court for the Southern District of New York
- Gregory G. Katsas – United States circuit judge for the United States Court of Appeals for the District of Columbia Circuit
- Charles Petros Kocoras – United States federal judge of the District Court for the Northern District of Illinois
- Thomas Demetrios Lambros – former United States federal judge
- Paul J. Liacos – chief justice of the Massachusetts Supreme Judicial Court from 1989 to 1996
- John Michael Manos – United States federal judge for 30 years
- Costa M. Pleicones – jurist who served as the Chief Justice of the South Carolina Supreme Court
- Eleni M. Roumel – Judge, United States Court of Federal Claims
- John J. Stamos – justice of the Illinois Supreme Court from 1988 to 1990
- Nicholas Tsoucalas – Senior Judge for the United States Court of International Trade
- Thomas A. Varlan – United States district judge for the United States District Court for the Eastern District of Tennessee
- Paula Xinis – United States district judge of the United States District Court for the District of Maryland
- Theodora Gaïtas - Current Minnesota Associate Justice of the Minnesota Supreme Court; former judge for the Minnesota Court of Appeals; former Minnesota District Court Judge

== Literature ==
=== Drama: Theater, TV, and screenwriting ===
- A. I. Bezzerides – novelist and screenwriter
- Tina Fey – comedian, former head writer of Saturday Night Live and creator of 30 Rock
- Zoe Kazan – screenwriter and playwright
- Nico Mastorakis – novelist, script writer
- Harry Mark Petrakis – novelist, short story writer, screenwriter, biographer, educator, and lecturer
- Evan Spiliotopoulos – screenwriter

=== Fiction ===
- A. I. Bezzerides – novelist and screenwriter
- N. A. Diaman – novelist and artist
- Charles Patton Dimitry - journalist, poet, and author
- John Bull Smith Dimitry - journalist and author
- Jeffrey Eugenides – novelist and short story writer
- Panio Gianopoulos – writer, editor
- Nico Mastorakis – novelist, script writer
- George Pelecanos – crime novelist and television drama writer (The Wire)
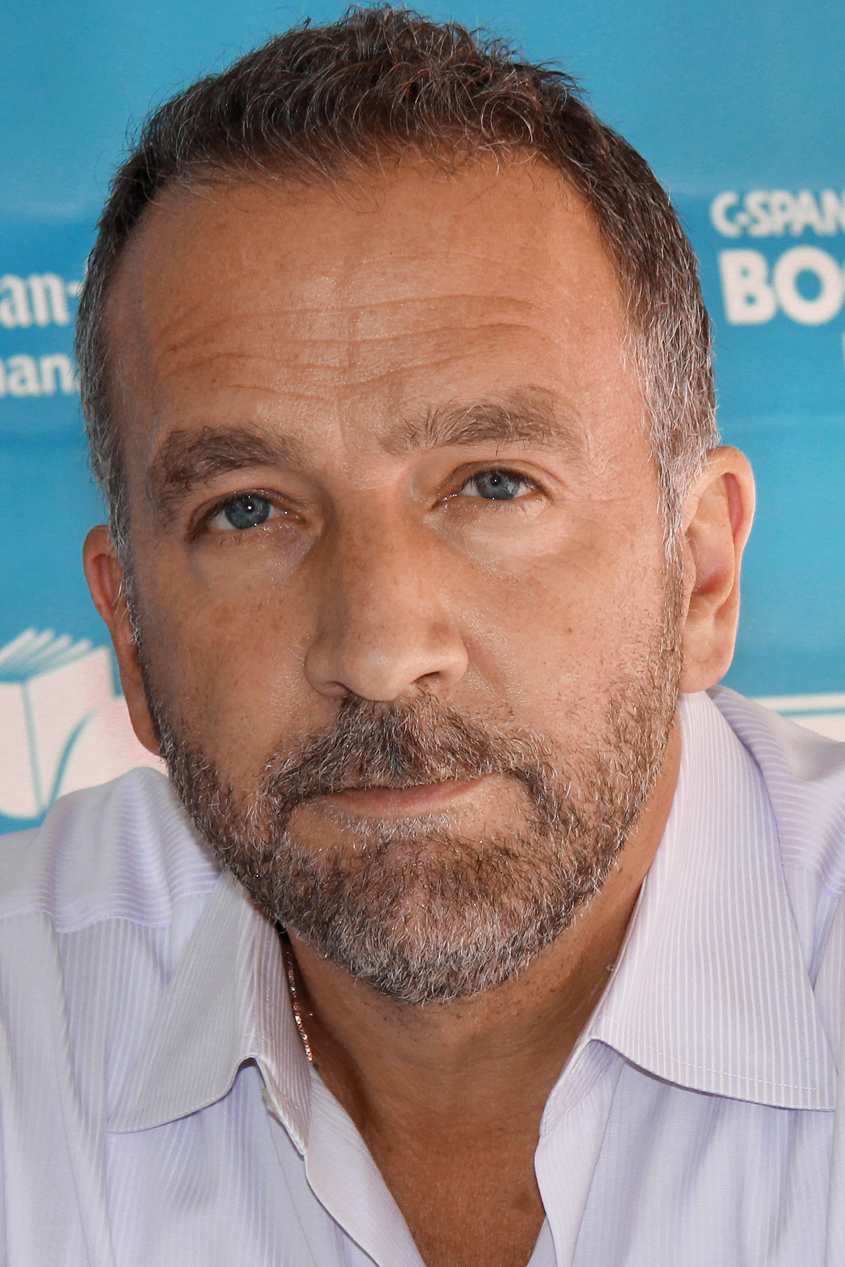
  George Pelecanos, crime novelist and writer for The Wire
- Harry Mark Petrakis – novelist, short story writer, screenwriter, biographer, educator, and lecturer
- Stephanos Papadopoulos – poet, translator
- David Sedaris – essayist, author and radio contributor
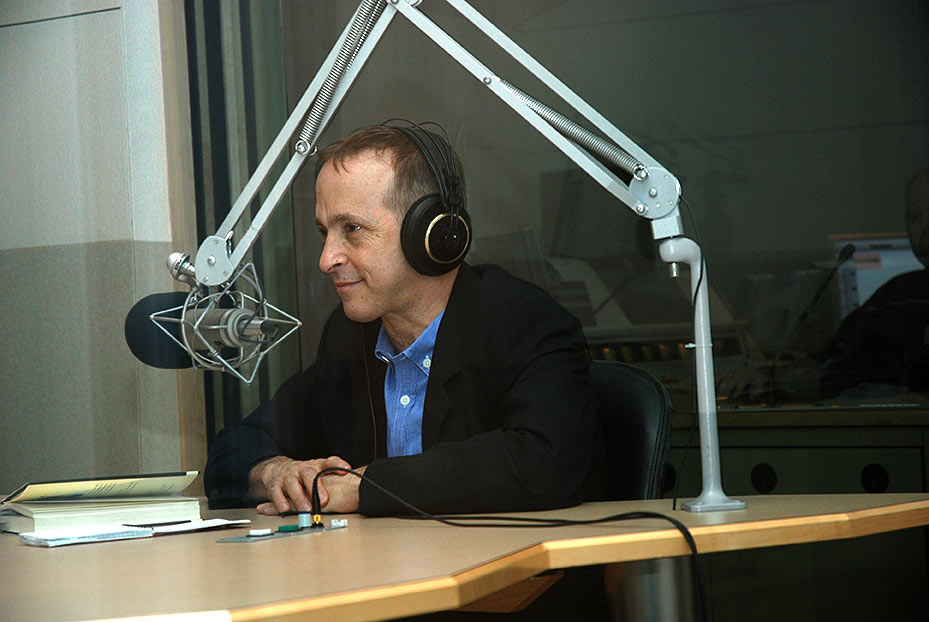
  David Sedaris, author and essayist
- Eleni Sikelianos – experimental poet with a particular interest in scientific idiom
- Byron Vazakas – poet (nominee for the Pulitzer Prize for Poetry, 1947)
- Michael Katakis – writer, photographer, and manager of Ernest Hemingway's literary estate

=== Nonfiction ===
- Chloe Aridjis – writer (daughter of Greek-Mexican Homero Aridjis and American Betty Ferber de Aridjis)
- Daphne Athas – writer
- Nicholas A. Basbanes – author who writes and lectures widely about books and book culture
- Demetrios Constantelos – priest and academic scholar
- Rae Dalven – author and academic (Romaniote - Greek Jewish)
- Nicholas Gage – reporter for The Wall Street Journal
- Dan Georgakas – writer, critic and member of the editorial board for Cineaste
- Panio Gianopoulos – writer and editor for Bloomsbury Publishing
- Vanessa Grigoriadis – contributing editor for New York magazine and Rolling Stone magazine
- George Gregoriou – William Paterson University professor, writer
- Arianna Huffington (born Arianna Stassinopoulos) - columnist, pundit and founder of the liberal website The Huffington Post
- John Kass – columnist, Chicago Tribune
- Paul Kemprecos
- Markos Kounalakis – president and publisher emeritus, 'Washington Monthly'; foreign affairs columnist, McClatchy
- Leon Logothetis – British-born author who now lives in Los Angeles, TV host, global adventurer, traveler, and inspirational speaker.
- Nick Mamatas
- Eric Metaxas
- Markos Moulitsas – blogger and political columnist, founder of the liberal blog Daily Kos
- Ion Hanford Perdicaris – author wrote about art and Moroccan culture. Son of 1st U.S. consul to Greece Gregory Perdicaris and kidnap victim in 1904 internationally covered incident known as "The Perdicaris Incident" which was resolved by President Theodore Roosevelt with a US marine intervention. A loose interpretation of the incident was the basis for the 1975 film The Wind and the Lion starring Sean Connery.
- Andrew Sarris – film critic and a leading proponent of the auteur theory of criticism
- Giorgio A. Tsoukalos

== Media ==
=== Television ===
- Ernie Anastos – WNYW-New York City co-anchorman
- Mike Emanuel - Fox News - Chief Washington Correspondent and anchor
- Chloe Melas – American journalist
- Thalia Assuras – TV reporter, CBS News (born in Canada, moved to U.S.)
- Dean Brelis – foreign correspondent for NBC, CBS and Time magazine
- Alexis Christoforous – CBS News Early Show
- Chris Clark – lead news anchor at WTVF in Nashville, TN. He also gave Oprah Winfrey her first television job
- Stefan Fatsis – National Public Radio
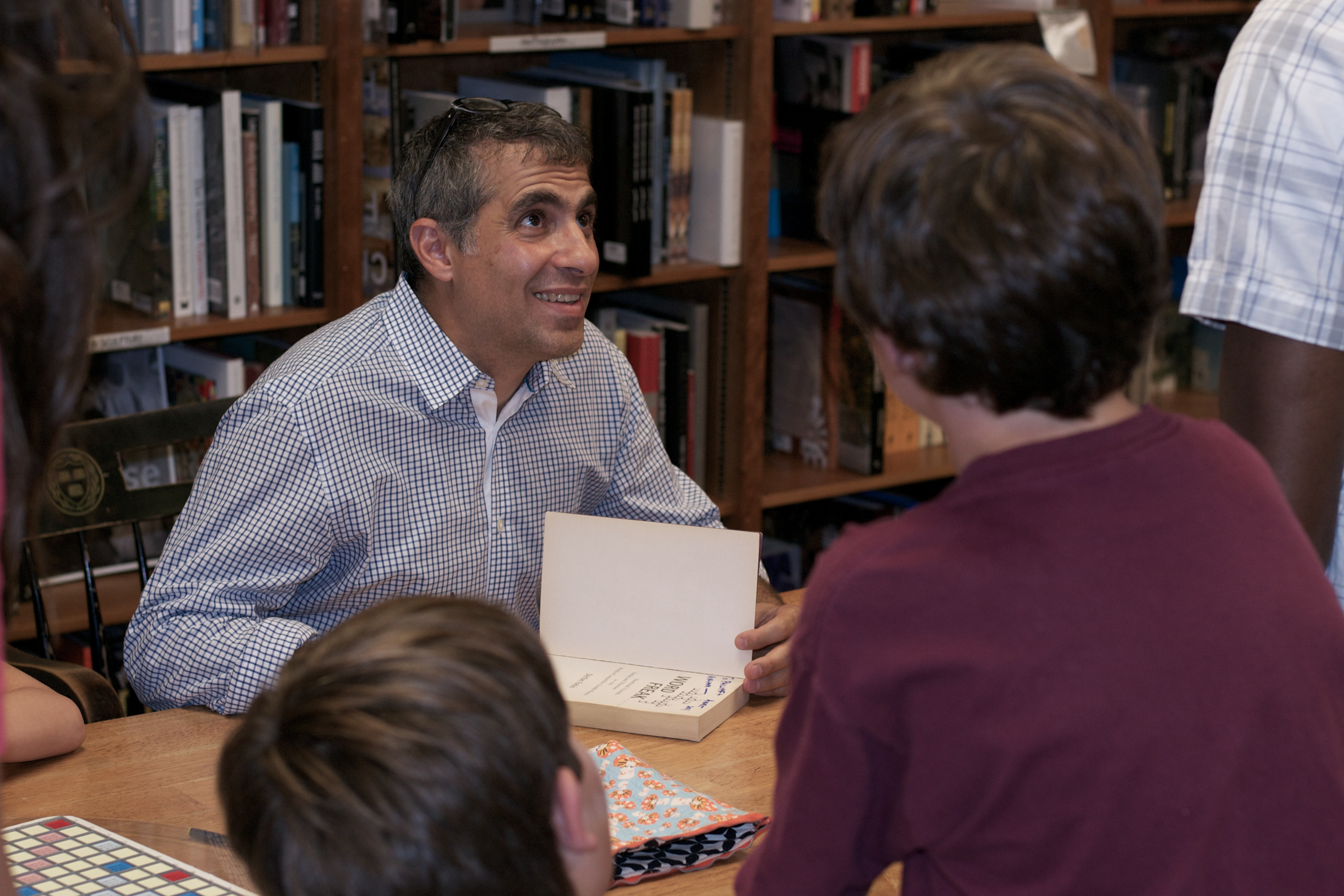
  Stefan Fatsis – NPR panelist, author
- Paul Glastris – editor-in-chief of The Washington Monthly
- Nick Gregory – WNYW New York meteorologist for over twenty years
- Chris Hondros – photojournalist
- Soterios Johnson – WNYC- morning anchor
- Demetria Kalodimos – anchorperson for WSMV-TV Nashville, Tennessee
- Ernie Manouse – TV anchor/producer, PBS
- Debbie Matenopoulos – television host, journalist, and lifestyle expert
- Maria Menounos – correspondent for Today and Access Hollywood
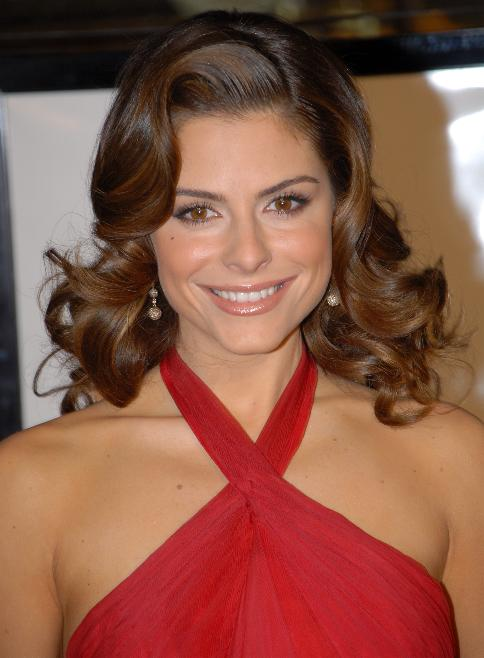
  Maria Menounos, correspondent for Today and Access Hollywood
- Ike Pappas – former CBS News correspondent
- Nicole Petallides – Fox business reporter
- Kopi Sotiropulos – meteorologist in Fresno, CA for KMPH-TV
- George Stephanopoulos – host of ABC's This Week with George Stephanopoulos
- Andrea Tantaros – Former Fox News commentator and host. Conservative political pundit.
- Betty White - Actress and comedian

=== Radio ===
- Chris Douridas – DJ and actor in Los Angeles market.

== Art and entertainment ==
=== Comedy ===
- Charlie Callas
- Tina Fey
- Zach Galifianakis
- Demetri Martin
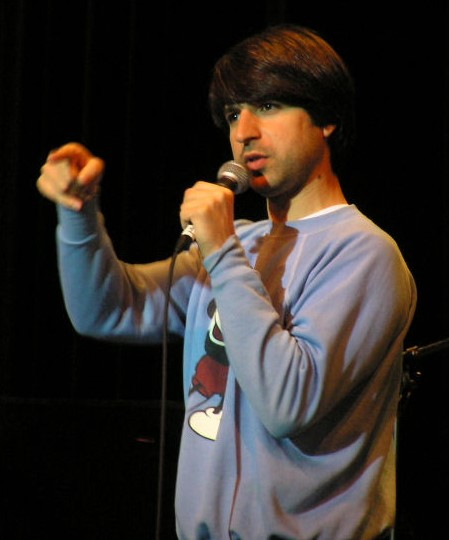
  Demetri Martin
- Amy Sedaris – father was of Greek descent
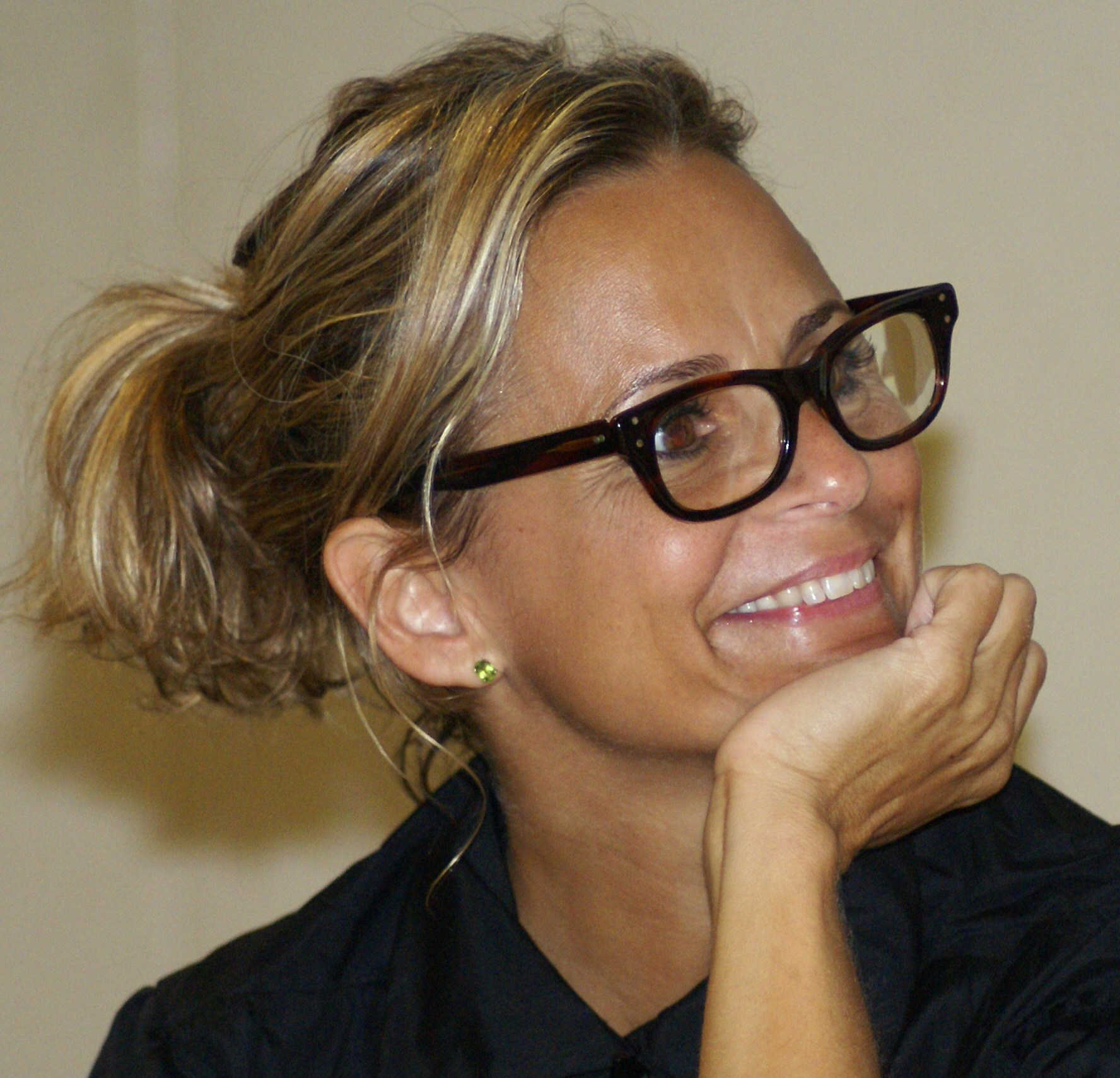
  Amy Sedaris
- Nia Vardalos
- Betty White
- Ana Gasteyer - maternal grandfather was Greek
- Stavros Halkias – ex co-host of comedy podcast Cum Town and current host of Stavvy's World Podcast

=== Dance ===
==== Choreography ====
- Hermes Pan – choreographer for Fred Astaire

==== Pop ====
- Corky Ballas – retired dancer, Dancing with the Stars father to Mark Ballas
- Mark Ballas – professional dancer on Dancing with the Stars
- Steve Condos – tap dancer

==== Tango ====
- Homer Ladas – Argentine tango dancer and teacher
- Karina Smirnoff – dancer Dancing with the Stars, Forever Tango. Her mother is Russian; her father is Greek.

=== Film, television, and theater ===
==== Actors ====
- Mika Abdalla – actress of Bulgarian, Lebanese, Greek, Italian, and German descent
- Jack Angel – actor, who has worked on many radio programs, animated television series, movies and video games
- John Aniston – actor, born Yannis Anastasakis, father of actress Jennifer Aniston
- Ant (Anthony Steven Kalloniatis) – Last Comic Standing comedian
- Lou Antonio – actor, best known for performing in the films Cool Hand Luke and America America
- Hank Azaria – actor, known foremost for his work on animated television series the Simpsons, he has worked on many television series and movies.
- Dave Bautista – former WWE professional wrestler (Greek mother and Filipino father) and actor
- Ted Beniades – character actor of screen and stage who was best known for appearing in Brian De Palma's Scarface as Siedelbaum
- Abraham Hercules Benrubi – actor
- Desmin Borges – actor
- Dennis Boutsikaris
- Charlie Callas – comedian and actor
- Paul Carafotes - actor, writer, producer
- John Cassavetes – movie director, actor
- Paul Cavonis – TV and movie actor
- George Chakiris – Academy Award winner "Best Supporting Actor" for West Side Story (1961 film)
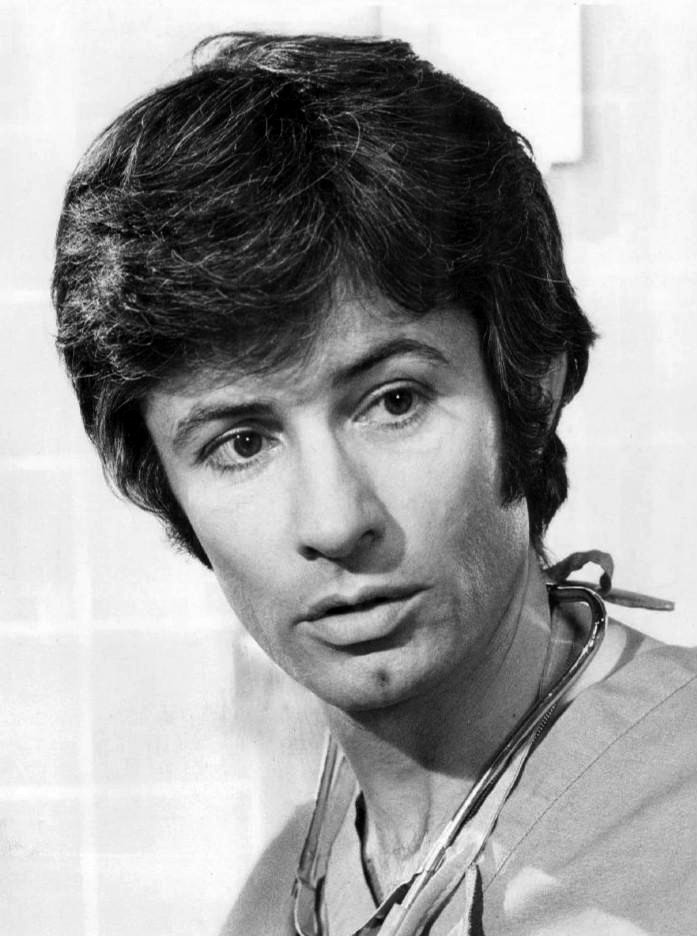
  George Chakiris
- Michael Chiklis – of 3/4 Greek descent
- John Considine – grandson of vaudeville and film producer Alexander Pantages on his mother's side, and nephew on his father's side to writer Bob Considine. Brother to actor/writer Tim Considine. Notable for his role as a writer for the 1960s American television series Combat! as well as appearances as an actor in series like Knight Rider and Murder, She Wrote.
- Tim Considine – actor, writer and photographer, grandson of vaudeville and film producer Alexander Pantages. Noted for his writing work on the American TV series Combat!, along with his brother John Considine, and his starring role as Jamie Frederick in My Three Sons.
- Michael Constantine – actor, born Constantine Ioannides, son of Greek immigrants.
- Nick Dennis – actor, known for playing ethnic types in films such as Kiss Me Deadly, Sirocco and A Streetcar Named Desire
- Chris Diamantopoulos (born 1975) – Canadian-born actor
- Dimitri Diatchenko (1968–2020) – actor, of partial Greek descent
- Michael Flessas – actor, Palme d'Or (Golden Palm) winning film Dancer in the Dark at the Cannes Film Festival. Paternal grandparents both born in Greece.
- Zach Galifianakis – father is of Greek descent
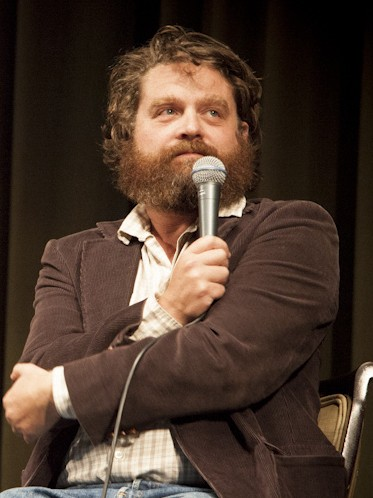
  Zach Galifianakis
- Tony Ganios – actor, probably best known for his role as Anthony 'Meat' Tuperello in the 1982 hit comedy Porky's and its sequels
- Christopher George – "The Rat Patrol" (1966–1968)
- Demetrius Joyette – actor
- John Kapelos – Canadian-born actor of film and TV
- Ron Karabatsos – actor
- Robert Karvelas – actor who is notable for his role as the Chief's dense assistant, Larrabee, on the 1960s sitcom Get Smart
- Andreas Katsulas
- Nick Kiriazis – actor
- Nikos Kourkoulos – Greek stage and film star who also appeared on Broadway.
- Elias Koteas – Canadian/US movie actor
- Peter Lupus – bodybuilder and actor, best remembered for the role of Willy Armitage in the original Mission: Impossible television series in the 1960s
- Ralph Macchio – father is of half-Italian and half-Greek descent
- George Maharis
- Rami Malek – American movie actor of partial Greek descent.
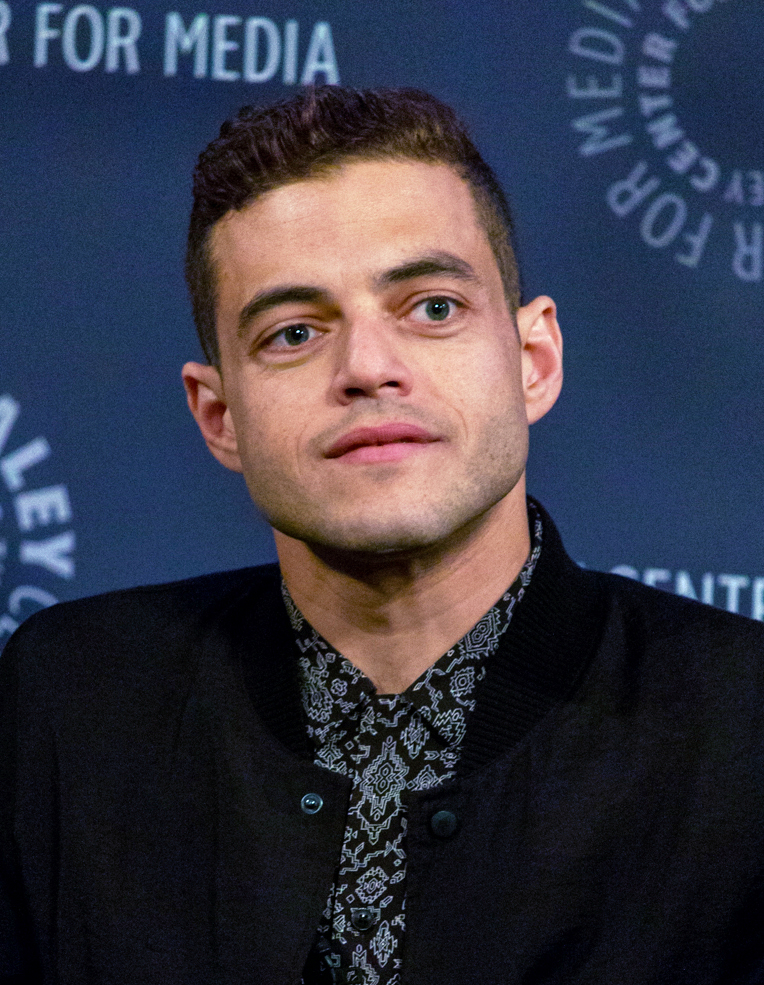
  Rami Malek
- Jason Mantzoukas – American actor, comedian, and writer.

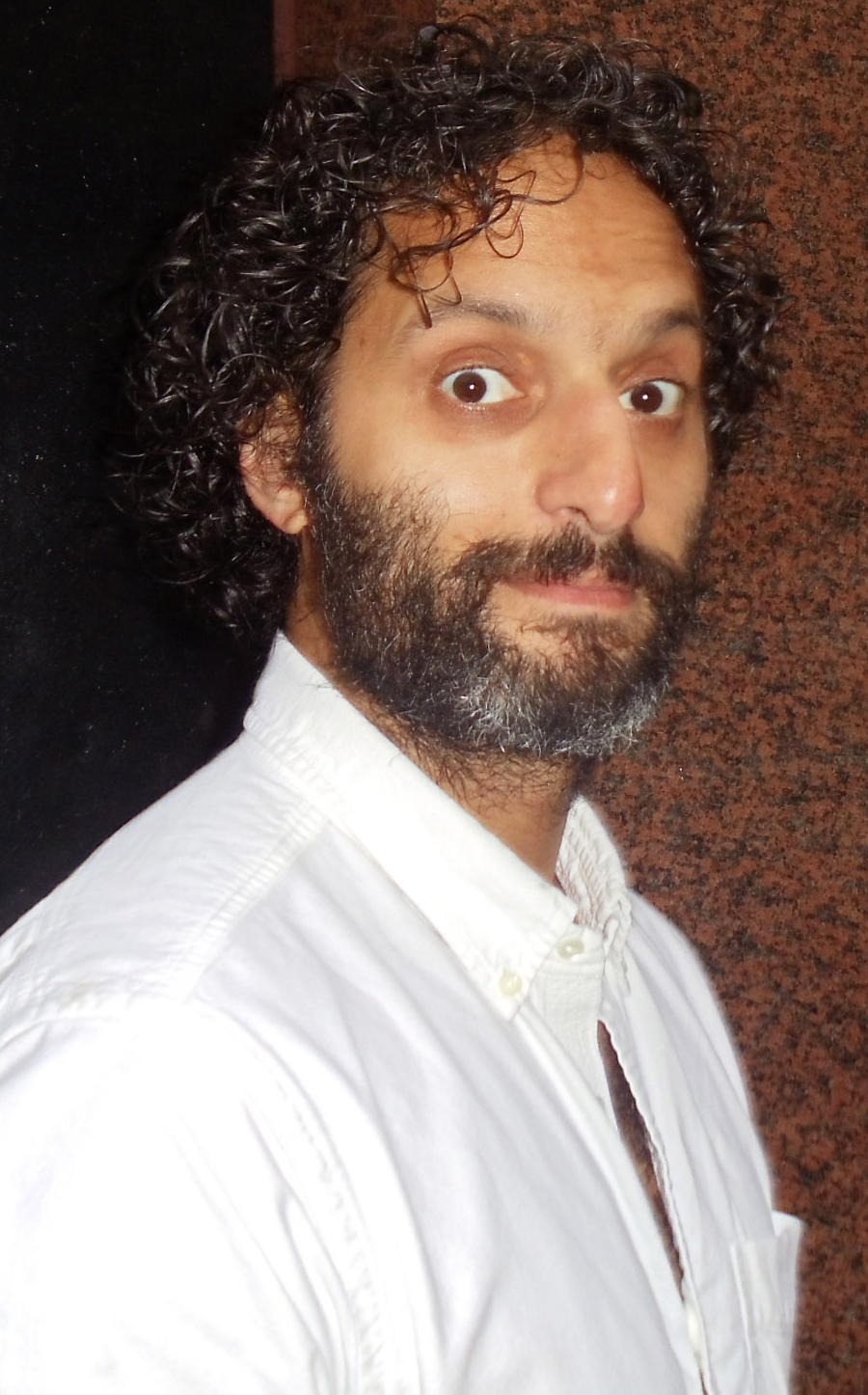
Jason Mantzoukas

- Adoni Maropis – star of 24 among other titles.
- Constantine Maroulis
- David Mazouz – actor, his mother is of Greek-Jewish descent
- Andy Milonakis
- Nico Minardos
- Ryan Pinkston – TV and movie actor; model, mother is of Greek descent
- Chris Sarandon
- George Savalas
- Telly Savalas
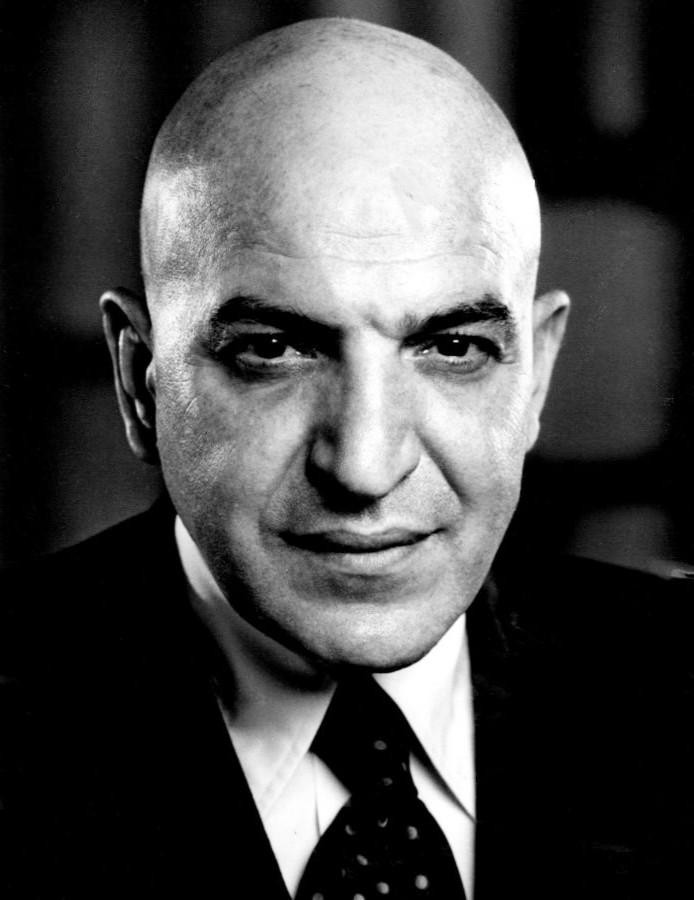
  Telly Savalas
- Stelio Savante – actor, producer and writer whose credits include Ugly Betty, Running For Grace, My Super Ex Girlfriend and No Postage Necessary
- Zachary Scott – actor who was most notable for his roles as villains and "mystery men"
- Alexander Scourby – actor and narrator, played 'Old Polo' in Giant, James Dean's last film
- Alek Skarlatos – US Army National Guard soldier awarded the Soldier's Medal from US President Barack Obama and the Legion of Honor by French President François Hollande for his participation in the thwarting of terrorist train attack on the 2015 Thalys train attack. Portrayed himself in Clint Eastwood's film The 15:17 to Paris (2018).
- Ted Sorel – actor whose numerous credits included Guiding Light, Law & Order and Star Trek: Deep Space Nine
- John Stamos – father was of Greek descent
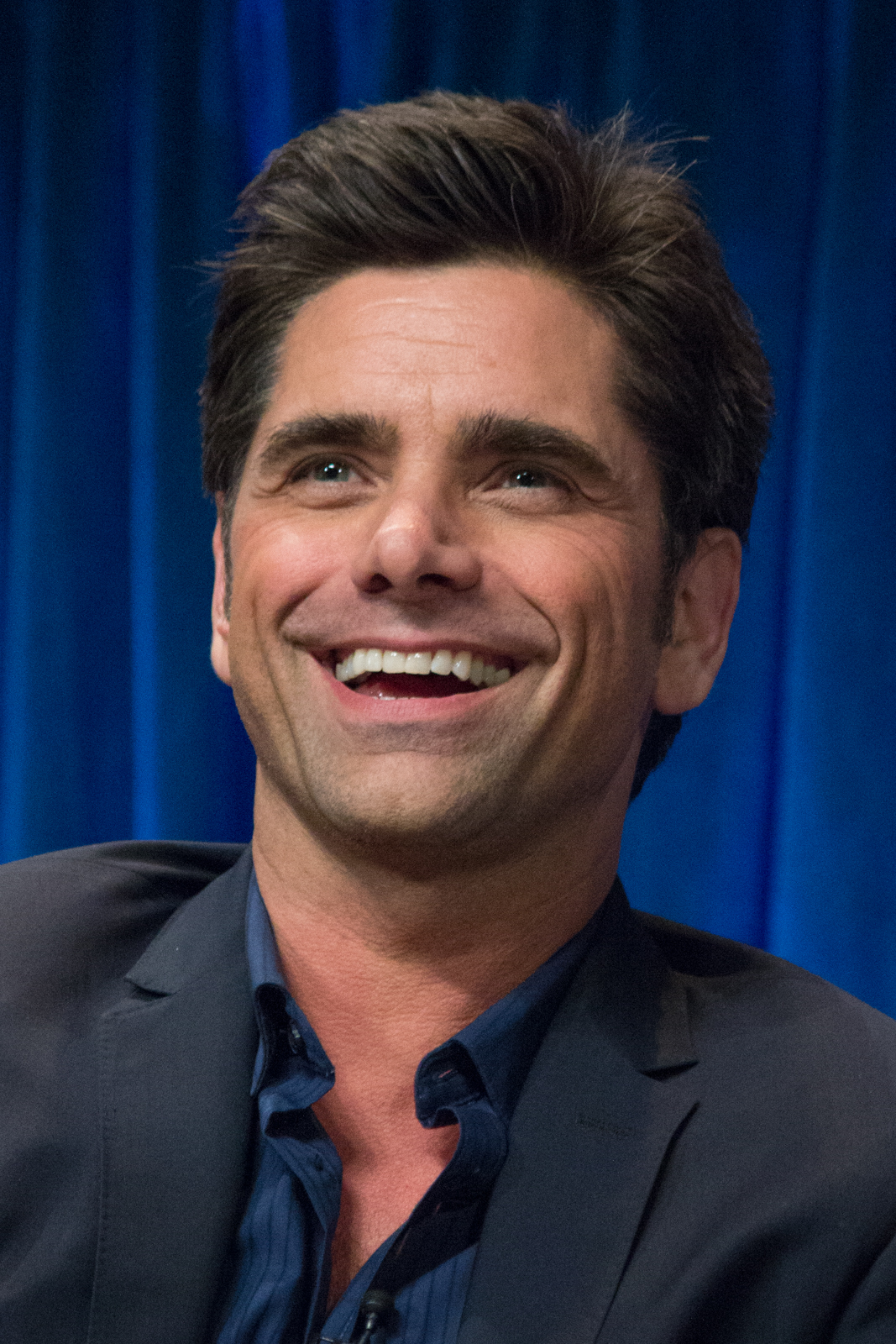
  John Stamos
- Gus Trikonis – actor appeared in West Side Story along with his sister, Gina Trikonis. 1st husband of Goldie Hawn.
- Dan Vadis – actor famous for his lead roles in many Italian films made in the 1960s
- Titos Vandis – Greek stage and film star. Later starred on Broadway and in Hollywood. Character actor in over 100 U.S. TV shows and dozens of U.S. films.
- Jimmy Workman – actor
- Billy Zane – actor and director, best known for his role as Caledon Hockley in the film Titanic.
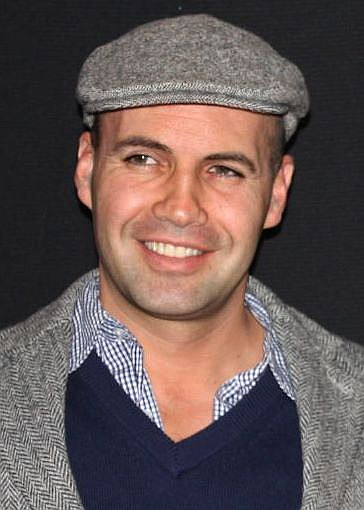
  Billy Zane

==== Actresses ====
- Jennifer Aniston – father is Greek, Golden Globe and Primetime Emmy Award-winning film/television actress, best known for her role as Rachel Green on the sitcom Friends, daughter of actors John Aniston and Nancy Dow.
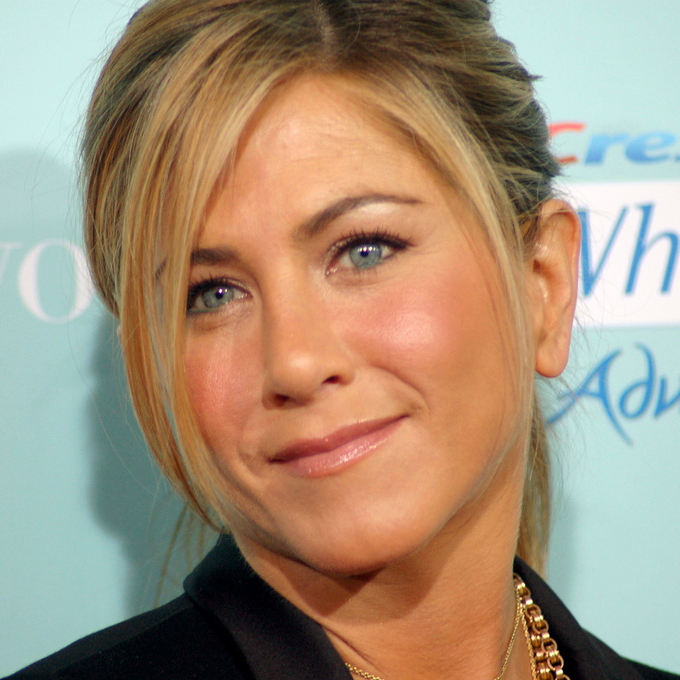
  Jennifer Aniston
- Paula Cale
- Dimitra Arliss – actress
- Gabrielle Carteris – actress, best known for her role as Andrea Zuckerman on the television series Beverly Hills, 90210 (father was of Greek descent)
- Jessica Chastain – Academy Award-winning actress (distant origin on her father's side)
- Katie Chonacas
- Margia Dean – former American beauty queen and actress
- Nancy Dow – actress, mother of actress Jennifer Aniston, is said to have some Greek ancestry
- Olympia Dukakis – Academy Award and Golden Globe-winning actress.
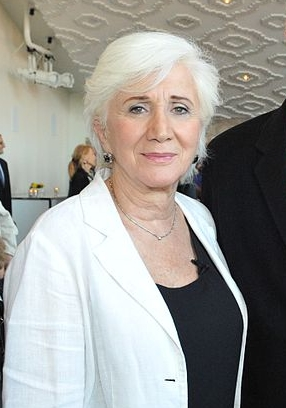
  Olympia Dukakis
- Tina Fey – mother is of Greek descent
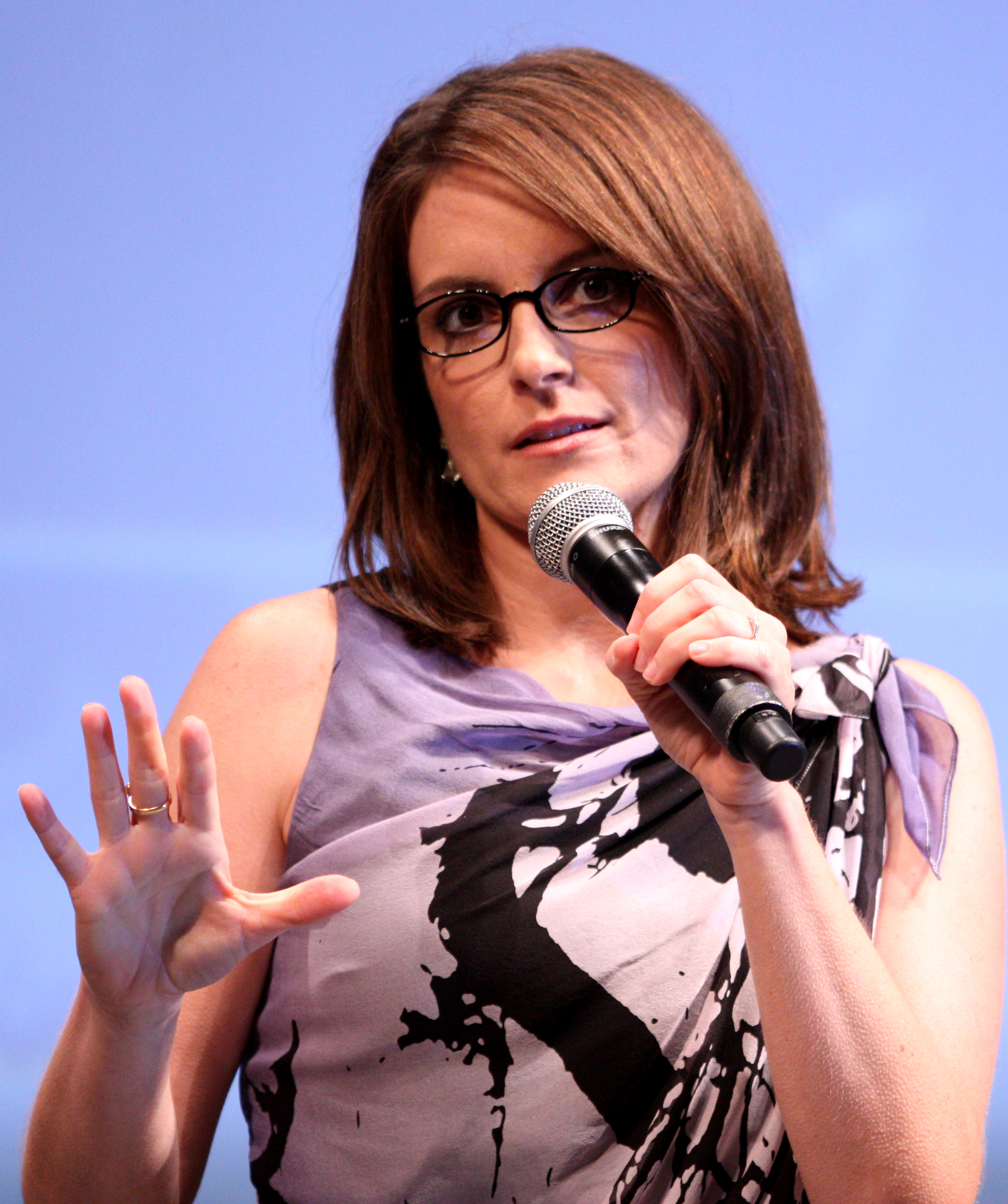
  Tina Fey
- Heather Goldenhersh – Tony Award nominated actress
- Xenia Gratsos
- Sasha Grey – content creator-presenter/former adult star; mixed Greek, Irish and Polish ancestry
- Angie Harmon – maternal grandparents were of Greek descent
- Lindsay Hartley – mother is of part Greek descent
- Marilu Henner
- Ally Ioannides – actress, grandfather was a Greek immigrant
- Melina Kanakaredes – actress, best known for Guiding Light, Providence, CSI: NY and The Resident
- Kym Karath – actress, best known for her role as Gretl in The Sound of Music
- Zoe Kazan – actress, paternal grandfather, Elia Kazan, was Greek
- Melia Kreiling – actress, Greek mother
- Lauren Lapkus-actress, screenwriter Greek-Serbian mother.
- Maria Menounos
- Sofia Milos
- Alexa Nikolas
- Elizabeth Perkins – father was of Greek descent
- Amy Sedaris - actress and comedian
- Jamie-Lynn Sigler – father is of Greek Jewish and Romanian Jewish descent
- Marina Sirtis - played Counselor Deanna Troi in Star Trek: The Next Generation.
- Tracy Spiridakos – actress, born in Canada by Greek-born parents, best known for her role as Charlotte "Charlie" Matheson in the NBC post-apocalyptic science fiction series Revolution.
- Mena Suvari – actress, best known for her roles in the films American Pie and American Beauty, maternal grandmother was of Greek descent
- Gina Trikonis – actress who appeared in West Side Story along with her brother Gus Trikonis.
- Nia Vardalos – actress. From My Big Fat Greek Wedding; Canadian-born
- Denise Vasi - actress, best known for All My Children (2008–2011) and Single Ladies (2011-2015).
- Gloria Votsis – actress. She is known for her small roles in several TV series such as Hawaii Five-0, The Gates, CSI, CSI: NY, CSI: Miami, and Suburgatory. Votsis also had a starring role in the film The Education of Charlie Banks alongside Jesse Eisenberg. She also recurred as Alex Hunter on the USA drama White Collar.
- Betty White – maternal grandfather was Greek - actress
- Rita Wilson – actress, film producer and singer, mother is of Greek descent
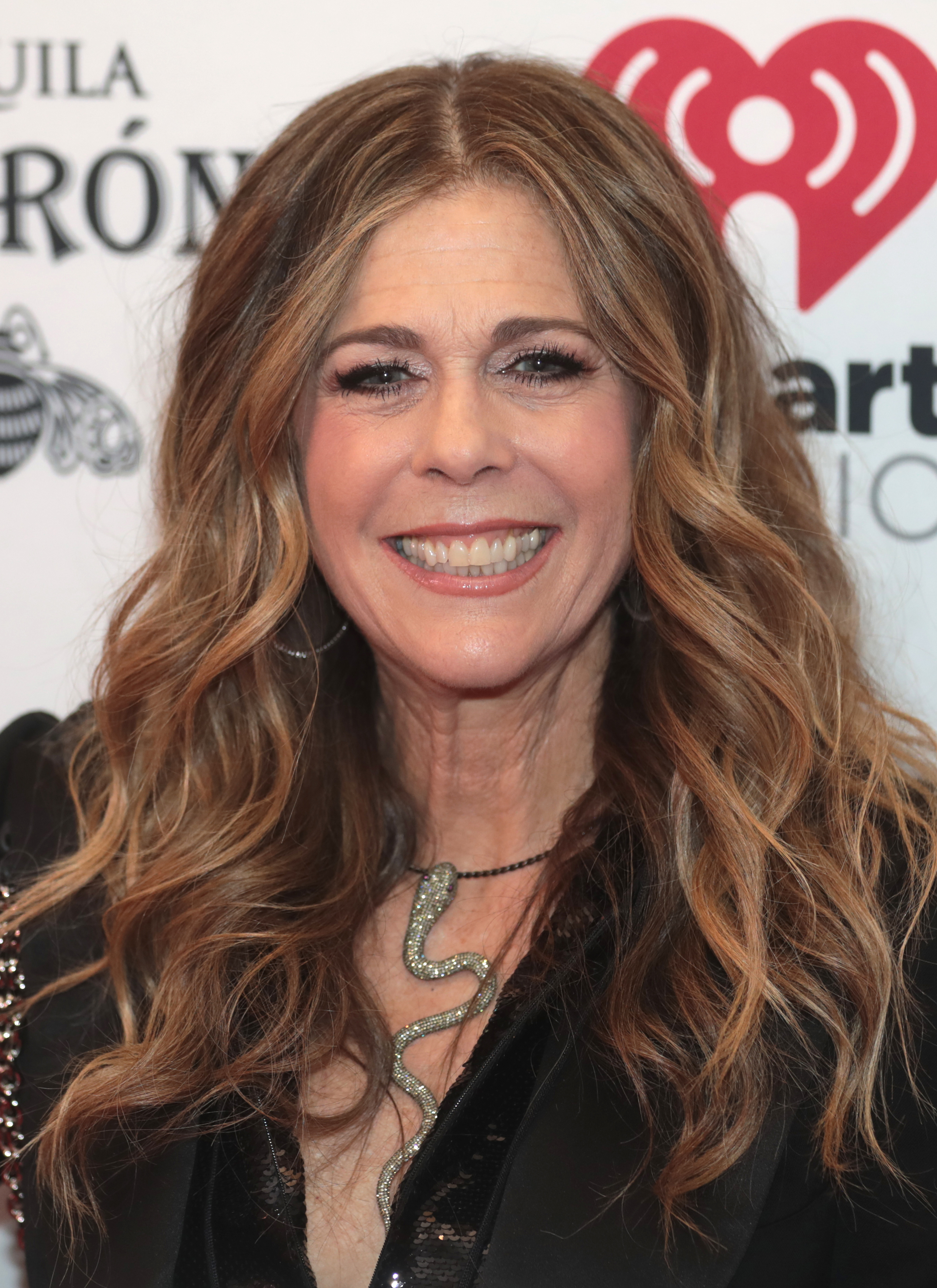
  Rita Wilson
- Tiffani Thiessen – actress
- Ariel Winter – actress
- Shanelle Workman – voice actress for various video games and animated TV shows, mother is of Greek descent
- Elena Kampouris – actress
- Haley Pullos – actress
- Kyra Zagorsky – actress
- Lisa Zane – actress and singer, sister of actor Billy Zane.

==== Art direction, costume design, set design ====
- George Barris (auto customizer) – designer and builder of many famous Hollywood custom cars, including The Batmobile for the Batman (TV series).
- Anna Louizos – Tony award nominated scenic designer and art director
- Dean Tavoularis – Academy Award winner for Best Art Direction (The Godfather Part II)
- Mary Zophres – costume designer, nominated for the Academy Award for Best Costume Design for the 2010 film True Grit

==== Casting ====
- Cassandra Kulukundis – Academy Award-winning casting director

==== Choreography ====
- Hermes Pan – choreographer for Fred Astaire

==== Cinematography ====
- Chris Condon – cinematographer and 3D pioneer
- Michael Gioulakis – cinematographer
- Phedon Papamichael – director, cinematographer
- Harris Savides – cinematographer

==== Directors ====
- Juliet Bashore – cult film & television director, Kamikaze Hearts, The Battle of Tuntenhaus
- Alexandra Cassavetes – director, daughter of John Cassavetes
- John Cassavetes – movie director, actor
- Nick Cassavetes – movie director
- Tom Cherones – director and producer of several TV series. His most well-known directing work is on Seinfeld
- George Pan Cosmatos^{1}, film director, Tombstone, Rambo: First Blood Part II
- Milton Katselas – director, Hollywood acting teacher
- Elia Kazan – movie director, two-time Academy Award winner for Gentleman's Agreement and On the Waterfront, A Streetcar Named Desire, Viva Zapata, East of Eden
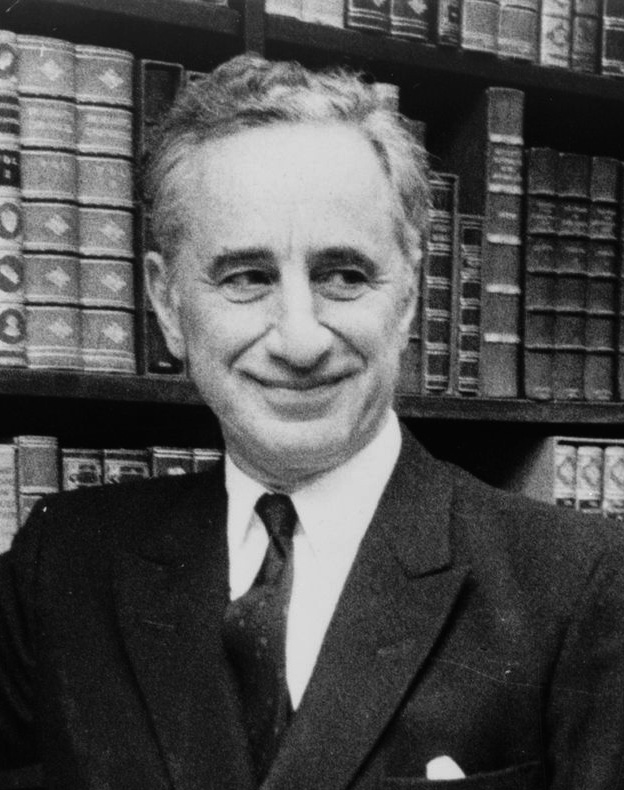
  Elia Kazan Director, two-time Academy Award winner for Gentleman's Agreement and On the Waterfront
- Tony Leondis – film director, writer and voice actor of animation
- Dimitri Logothetis
- Gregory Markopoulos – film director, New American Cinema of the 1960s
- Nico Mastorakis – film and TV director
- Melina Matsoukas
- Andrew Moskos – producer/owner of Boom Chicago
- Alexander Payne – Academy Award winning movie director
- Nikos Psacharopoulos – theater producer, director, and educator
- Andy Sidaris – film director of cult B-movie films
- Penelope Spheeris – director (Wayne's World)
- Greg Yaitanes – television and film director
- Billy Zane – actor, director

==== Makeup and special effects ====
- Karen Goulekas – visual effects artist
- Jack Pierce – designer of makeup and costumes for all of Universal Studios's iconic movie monsters, including: Frankenstein, Dracula, The Wolf Man, et al.
- Patrick Tatopoulos – special effects and creature designer
- Petro Vlahos – Oscar-awarded Hollywood special effects pioneer

==== Producers ====
- Jean Doumanian – born Jeannine Karabas. Early associate producer of Saturday Night Live and briefly replaced Lorne Michaels as Executive Producer; Producer of seven Woody Allen films. Tony Award-winning producer of several Broadway plays.
- Sid Ganis
- Laeta Kalogridis – screenwriter, TV and film producer
- Tom Kapinos
- Anthony Katagas – film producer
- Nicholas Kazan – screenwriter, film producer, director. He is the son of director Elia Kazan and his first wife, playwright Molly Kazan
- Nico Mastorakis – film and TV producer
- Dino Stamatopoulos – television comedy writer, actor and producer who has worked on Mr. Show, TV Funhouse, Mad TV, Moral Orel, and Late Night with Conan O'Brien
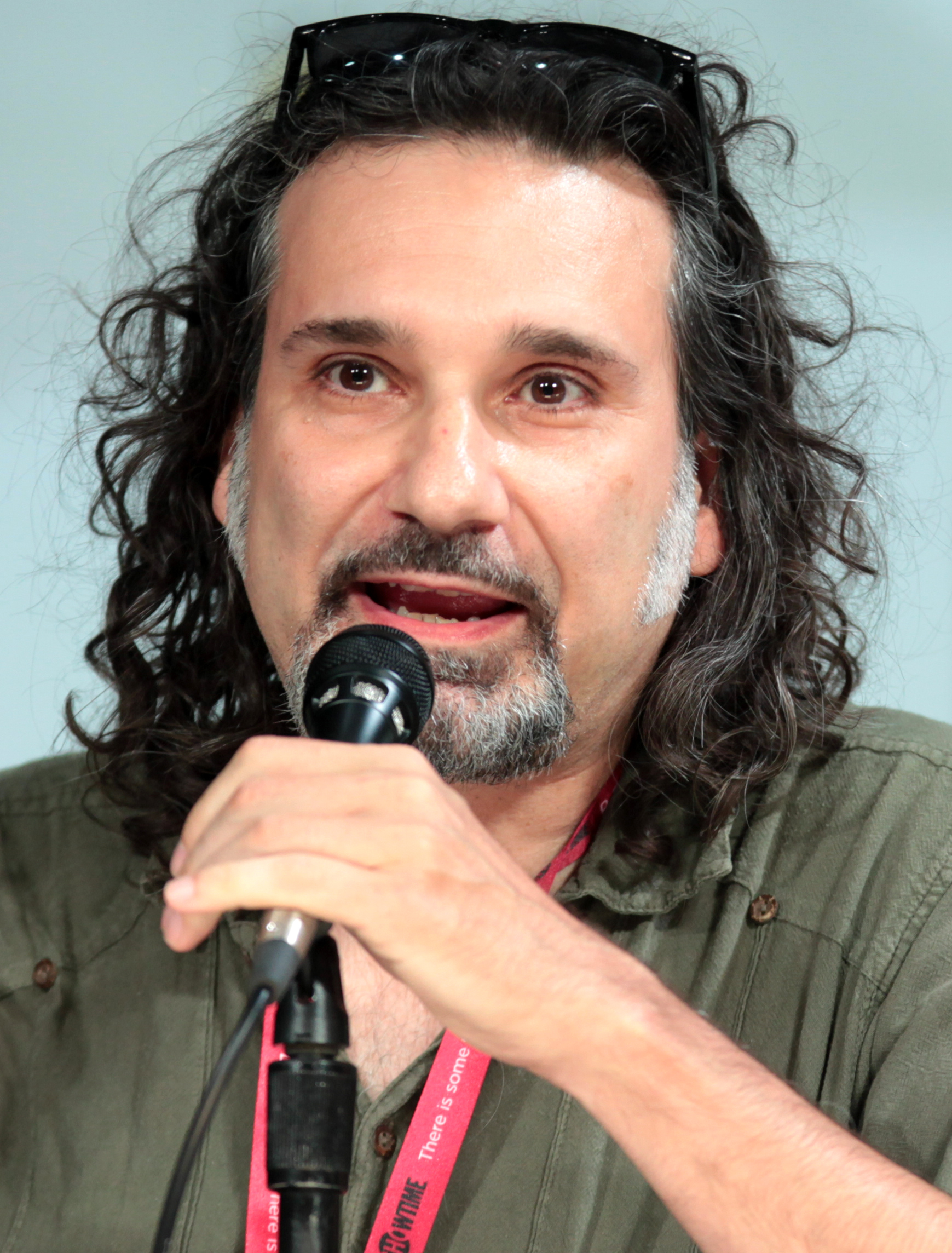
  Dino Stamatopoulos
- Ted Sarandos – chief content officer at Netflix
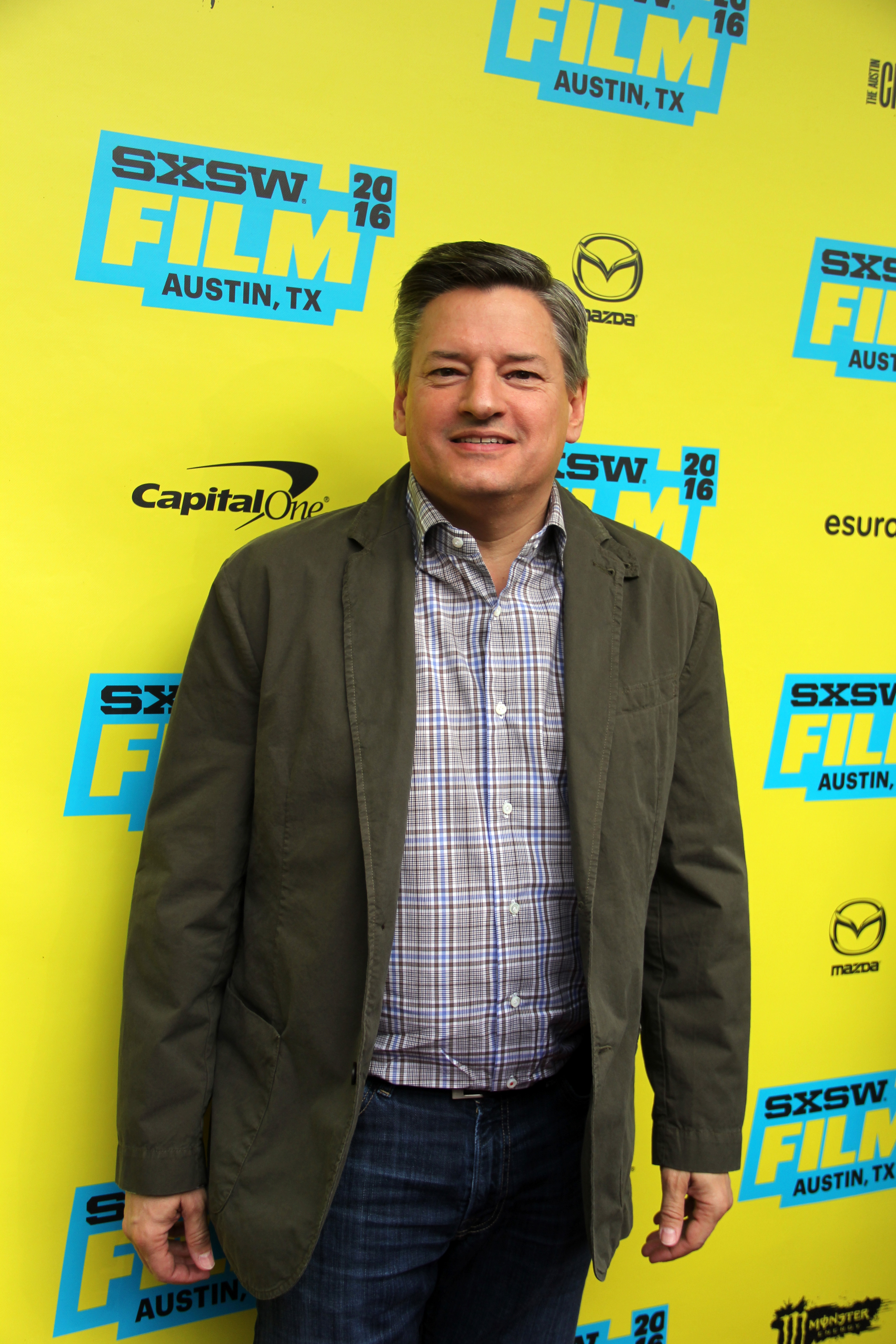
  Ted Sarandos

==== Props ====
- George Barris (auto customizer) – designer and builder of many famous Hollywood custom cars

==== Sound ====
- Mildred Iatrou Morgan – sound editor and audio engineer, nomination for the Academy Award for Best Sound Editing at the 89th Academy Awards

=== Magicians ===
- Criss Angel – illusionist

== Musicians ==
=== Composer ===
- Marco Beltrami – film composer
- John Cacavas – composer, conductor
- Dinos Constantinides - composer
- Andreas Makris - composer, conductor
- Basil Poledouris – film composer
- Christopher Theofanidis - composer
- George Tsontakis - composer
- James Yannatos - composer, conductor

=== Conductor ===
- Maurice Abravanel – conductor of classical music
- John Cacavas – composer, conductor
- Alexander Frey – conductor, pianist, organist, composer, recording artist
- Donald Johanos – conductor and music director with the Dallas Symphony Orchestra and the Honolulu Symphony Orchestra
- Steven Karidoyanes – composer, broadcaster and conductor with Plymouth Philharmonic Orchestra
- Dimitris Mitropoulos – world-renowned symphony conductor

=== Producers ===
- George Drakoulias – music producer
- Dino Fekaris – Grammy awarded composer (I Will Survive)
- Nick Venet – record producer

=== Classical ===
- Lefteris Bournias – clarinetist
- Constance Geanakoplos – classical pianist
- William Masselos – classical pianist
- Murray Perahia – concert pianist and conductor with roots in Thessaloniki

=== Country & western ===
- Kostas Lazarides – songwriter for many top C&W artists including: Dwight Yoakam, Patty Loveless, George Strait, and Travis Tritt.
- Lane Brody – singer. Born "Eleni Voorlas" in Chicago area. Brody and Johnny Lee wrote lyrics to and recorded the theme music for the 1983–1984 NBC television show, The Yellow Rose. The theme song of the same name became a No. 1 hit on the U.S. country singles chart on April 21, 1984.

=== Dark cabaret ===
- Lola Blanc – singer, songwriter; her father is Greek-American.

=== Disco ===
- Lourett Russell Grant – singer and record producer

=== New age ===
- Chris Spheeris – new age multi-instrumentalist, composer, recording artist, collaborated on several albums with Paul Voudouris
- Paul Avgerinos – composer, performer and producer of new-age music
- Yanni – new-age musician

=== Opera ===
- Maria Callas – considered one of the greatest opera sopranos of all time
- Tatiana Troyanos – mezzo-soprano

=== Pop ===
- The Andrews Sisters – singers
- Kelly Clarkson – American Idol (Season 1) winner
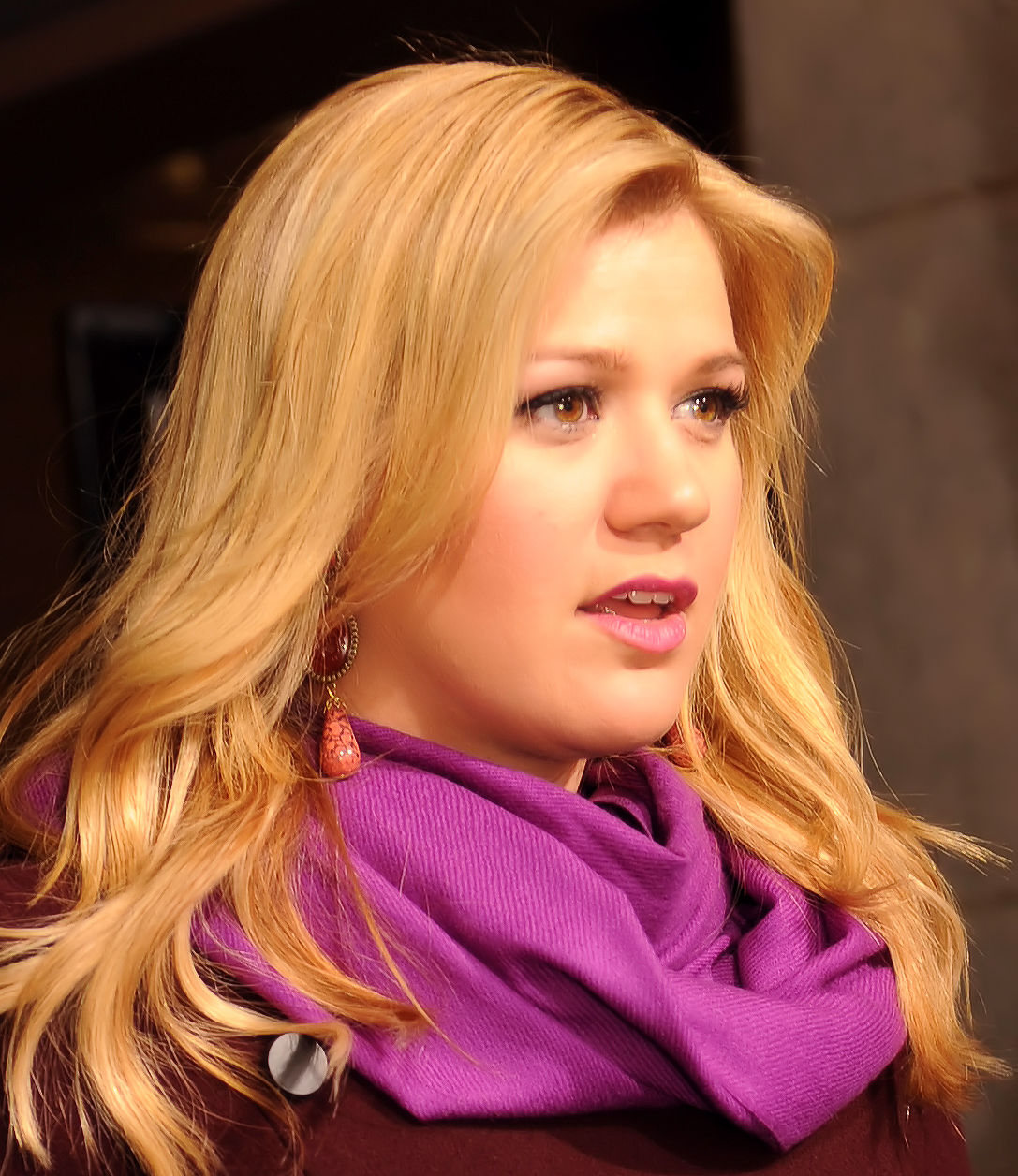
  Kelly Clarkson
- Kalomoira – pop singer
- George Michael – pop singer and songwriter
- Nick Noble – pop singer, popular in the mid-1950s and best known for his recordings of The Tip of My Finger and Moonlight Swim
- Tony Orlando – singer. Half Greek and half Puerto Rican.
- Chris Trousdale (born 1985) - singer, former Dream Street member
- Jim Verraros (born 1983) - singer, entertainer, one of the top 10 finalists in the first season of American Idol
- Evangelia (born 1992) - pop singer

=== Rock and metal ===
- Art Alexakis – singer/songwriter/guitarist, member of Everclear
- Teddy Andreadis – keyboardist
- Johnny Antonopoulos – singer/guitarist
- Seven Antonopoulos – rock drummer
- Tommy Clufetos – session drummer
- Warren Cuccurullo – rock musician and long-term member of Duran Duran
- Greg Dulli – musician
- The Fiery Furnaces – indie rock band
- Tomas Kalnoky – lead singer/guitarist and songwriter of the bands Streetlight Manifesto and Bandits of the Acoustic Revolution
- Wayne Kramer – guitarist for Motor City Five
- Tim Lambesis – lead singer of Metalcore band As I Lay Dying
- Tommy Lee – heavy metal drummer
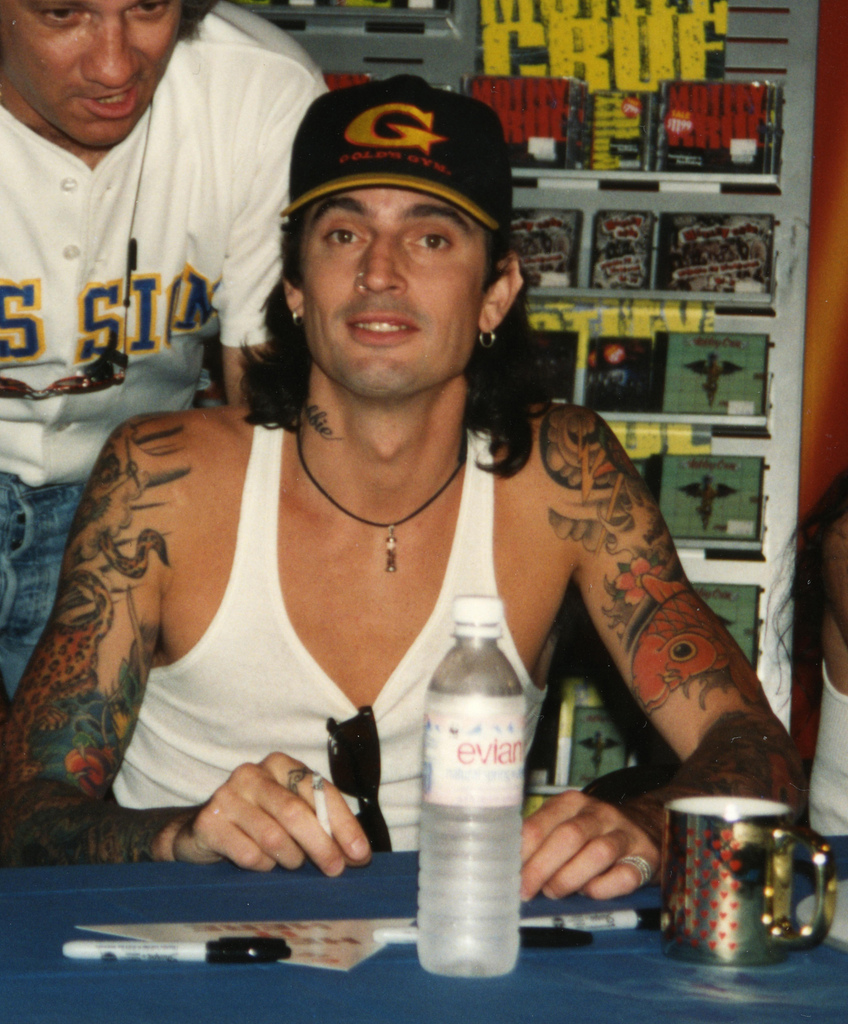
  Mötley Crüe drummer Tommy Lee
- Jim Matheos – guitarist and the primary songwriter for the progressive metal band Fates Warning
- Vicky Psarakis – vocalist of Canadian metal band The Agonist.
- Jim Sclavunos – drummer for Nick Cave and the Bad Seeds
- Derek Sherinian – virtuoso rock and jazz fusion keyboardist
- Jim Tasikas – primary songwriter and guitarist for progressive death metal band Contrarian
- Alex Varkatzas – lead singer of Hard Rock/Metalcore band Atreyu
- Frank Zappa – composer

=== Rap ===
- Peter Anastasopoulos (MadClip) - singer
- Arizona Zervas – rapper, singer and songwriter
- Andy Milonakis - streamer, actor, comedian and rapper
- Ruby da Cherry - rapper and one half of duo Suicideboys

=== Rock and roll ===
- Sarah Aroeste – Manhattan-based Jewish Ladino musician with roots in the Jewish Community of Thessaloniki.
- Annette Artani – singer-songwriter
- Amalia Bakas – singer of Greek traditional and rembetiko songs with a successful career in the United States.
- Sylvia Constantinidis – Venezuelan-born pianist, conductor, writer, music educator and composer.
- Nickitas J. Demos – composer of contemporary classical music drawing from Greek inspiration.
- Sotiris Eliopoulos – drummer of the indie rock band Mt. Joy.
- Tatiana von Fürstenberg – rock singer
- Diamanda Galás – performance artist, vocalist, and composer
- Nick Gravenites – blues, rock and folk singer-songwriter
- Fran Jeffries – singer, dancer, actress, and model
- Paul Lekakis – singer
- Jessie Malakouti – singer
- Athan Maroulis – singer, producer, musician, older brother of American Idol Season 4 finalist Constantine Maroulis
- Constantine Maroulis – singer, stage actor, American Idol (Season 4) finalist
- Dimitri Minakakis – original singer and founding member of the band The Dillinger Escape Plan
- Ted Nichols – composer conductor, arranger, educator, minister of music
- Becky O'Donohue – singer and American Idol (Season 5) semi-finalist
- Johnny Otis – rhythm and blues musician
- Shuggie Otis – rock, blues & funk guitarist and songwriter
- Jimmie Spheeris – singer-songwriter in the 1970s
- The Vanity Set – alternative/rebetiko rock band

=== Other Genres ===
- Sufjan Stevens - singer, songwriter, and multi-instrumentalist
- Ellis Stratakos - jazz trombonist and band leader

== Visual arts ==
=== Comics, cartoons ===
- Chris Eliopoulos – cartoonist and letterer of comic books
- Christos Gage – DC/Marvel Comics/Wildstorm and Law & Order writer
- Nicholas Galifianakis – cartoonist and artist who draws satirical cartoons
- Bill Jemas – former publisher of Marvel Comics & former executive vice president of Marvel Entertainment Group
- Stephan Pastis – cartoonist and the creator of the comic strip Pearls Before Swine
- George Roussos – comic book artist best known as one of Jack Kirby's Silver Age inkers
- Bob Rozakis – comic book writer and editor known mainly for his work in the 1970s and 1980s at DC Comics
- Mark Alan Stamaty – cartoonist and children's book writer and illustrator
- Aliki Theofilopoulos – cartoonist and director

=== Graffiti ===
- Alex Martinez – graffiti artist, illustrator, muralist (Greek mother)
- Taki 183 – original artist who spawned the Graffiti craze in New York City of 1960s-70s. Demetrios/Demetraki ("Taki") hailed from 183rd Street in Washington Heights, hence his moniker "Taki 183".

=== Illustrators ===
- Constantinos Coconis – illustrator
- Cleo Damianakes – etcher and illustrator of 1920s book dust jackets for Hemingway and Fitzgeralds
- Basil Gogos – horror painter/illustrator
- George Stavrinos – illustrator (Society of Illustrators Hall of Fame)

=== Painters ===
- William Baziotes – painter, a contributor to Abstract Expressionism
- Constantino Brumidi – Congressional Medal of Honor for paintings inside U.S. Capitol building.
- Thomas Chimes – painter
- Lillian Delevoryas – artist whose career spanned six decades
- Mary Grigoriadis – pioneering feminist and pattern painter
- Dino Kotopoulis – artist
- Ethel Magafan – painter and muralist
- William Spencer Bagdatopoulos – painter and commercial artist
- Theodoros Stamos – painter, a contributor to Abstract Expressionism, member of The Irascibles
- Theo Stavropoulos - painter
- Anthony Velonis – painter and designer, who helped introduce the public to silkscreen printing in the early 20th century
- Jean Xceron – abstract painter

=== Performance artists ===
- Mary Ashley – video artist, performance artist, and painter

=== Photography ===
- Marie Cosindas – photographer, best known for her evocative still life and color portraits
- Chris Hondros – Pulitzer Prize-nominated war photographer
- James Karales – Pulitzer Prize awarded photographer
- Christopher Makos – photographer for Calvin Klein, Esquire and Andy Warhol
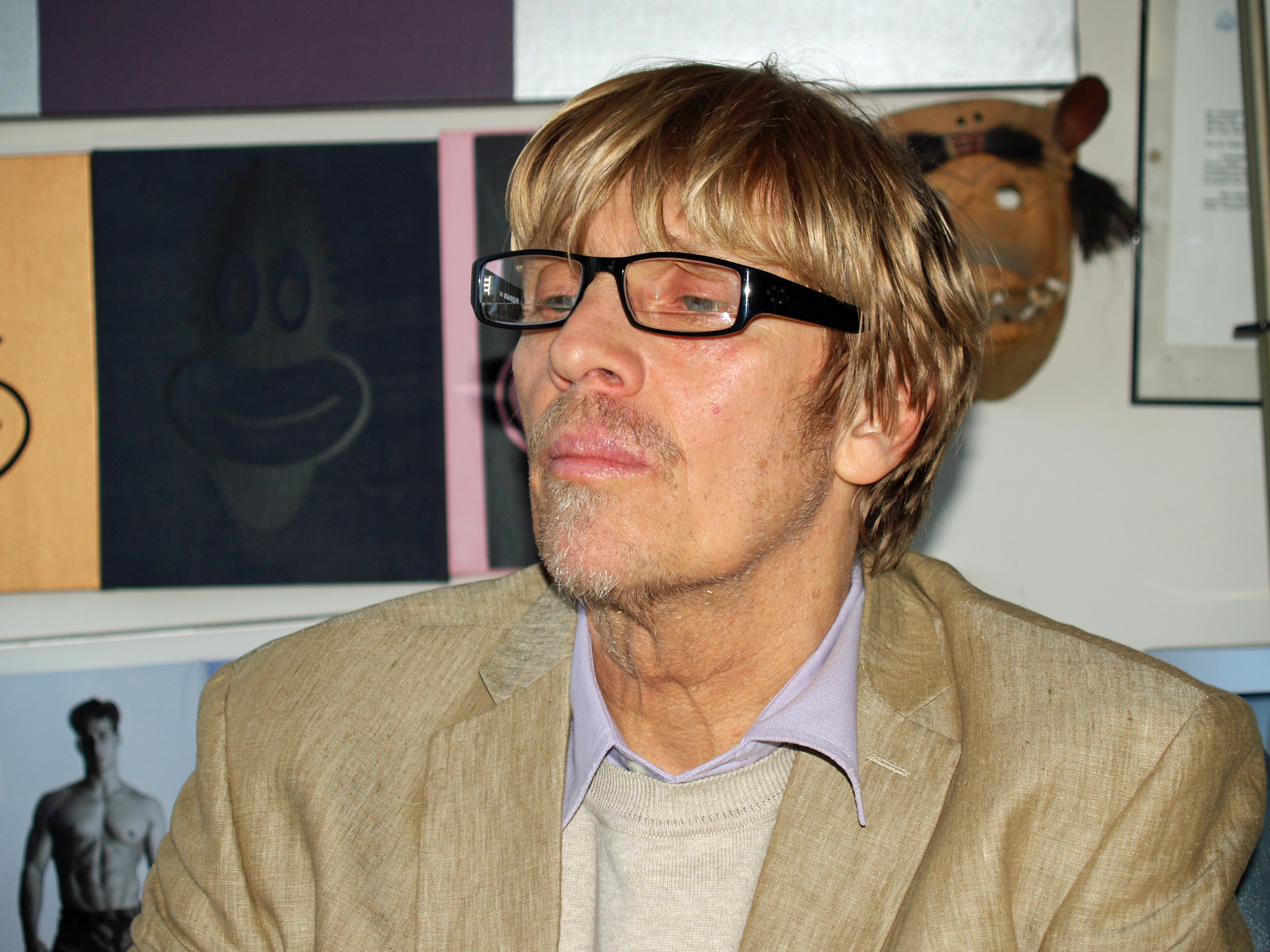
  Christopher Makos, photographer, by David Shankbone
- Constantine Manos – photographer (Leica Medal of Excellence in 2003)
- Tod Papageorge – art photographer
- Ithaka Darin Pappas – photographic artist and celebrity portraitist i.e.: NWA Straight Outta Compton, Marlee Matlin, Giancarlo Esposito, Takashi Murakami etc.
- Andrew Prokos – architectural and fine art photographer
- Popsie Randolph – photographer
- George Tames – photographer for The New York Times from 1945–1985
- Paul Vathis – photojournalist for the Associated Press for 56 years (Pulitzer Prize for Photography in 1962)

==== Sculptors ====
- Stephen Antonakos – sculptor
- Peter Forakis – abstract geometric sculptor
- Zenos Frudakis – figurative sculptor
- Chryssa – sculptor
- Lynda Benglis – sculptor and visual artist
- Dimitri Hadzi – sculptor
- Nicholas Legeros – bronze sculptor
- Peter Voulkos – sculptor, ceramics art innovator
- Electros Vekris – Sculptor kinetics

==== Unfiled ====
- Michael Janis – glass artist, one of the directors of the Washington Glass School, known for his work on glass using the exceptionally difficult sgraffito technique on glass
- Kimon Nicolaides – art teacher, author and artist, who developed the widely used method of teaching drawing "The Natural Way to Draw"
- Ithaka Darin Pappas – multi-disciplinary artist, creator of The Reincarnation of a Surfboard, credited with being the founder of the Contemporary Surf Art movement

== Military ==
- Gus George Bebas – naval aviator and a recipient of the Distinguished Flying Cross
- LTG Peter G. Burbules – retired United States Army Lieutenant General. U.S. Army Ordnance Hall of Fame.
- Matthew Bogdanos – colonel in the United States Marine Corps Reserves
- Chris Carr – United States Army soldier and a recipient of the United States military's highest decoration—the Medal of Honor
- Alden Partridge Colvocoresses – developer of the first satellite map of the United States
- George Colvocoresses – commander of the Saratoga during the American Civil War
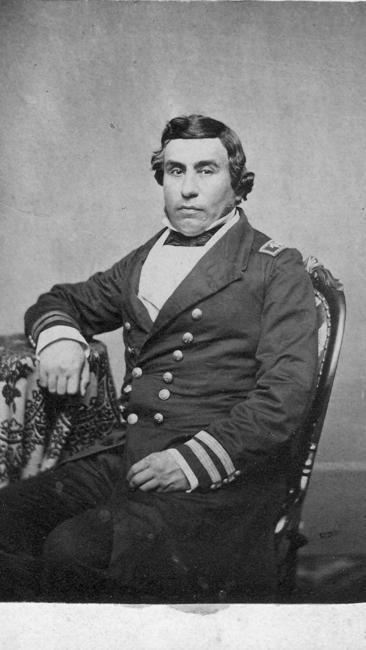
  George Colvocoresses, enslaved during the Chios massacre he would after his freedom from slavery emigrate to the United States and become a US Naval Officer; commanded the USS Saratoga during the American Civil War
- George Partridge Colvocoresses – led a distinguished military career rising to the rank of Admiral
- George Dilboy – first Greek-American to receive Medal of Honor
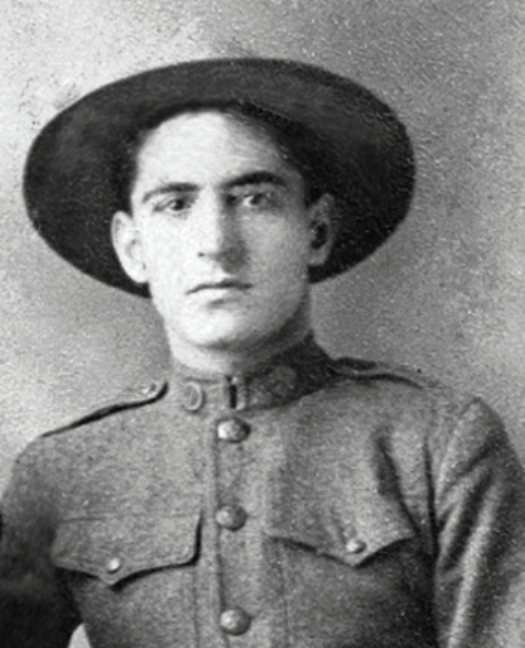
  George Dilboy – first Greek-American Medal of Honor recipient; served and died during his service in World War I
- Andrea Dimitry – Greek-American soldier in the War of 1812 fought in the Battle of New Orleans
- George Doundoulakis – Greek-American soldier who worked under British Intelligence during World War II and served with the OSS in Thessaly, Greece. Later becoming a physicist, he is known by his twenty-six US patents in the fields of radar, electronics, and narrowband television.
- Helias Doundoulakis – served in the United States Army and the Office of Strategic Services — the OSS — as a spy during the Battle of Crete in WWII. Later becoming a civil engineer, he worked on many elite projects for the U.S. Navy and NASA as project leader at Grumman Aerospace. Brother of George Doundoulakis.
- Michel Dragon (1739–1821) Greek American Lieutenant in the American Revolution fought in the Siege of Pensacola.
- Photius Fisk (1809–1890) American abolitionist, Chaplain U.S.N., lobbied to abolish flogging in the U.S. Navy
- Jack H. Jacobs, Vietnam War veteran. Medal of Honor recipient (of Romaniote Jewish descent).
- James G. Kalergis – U.S. Army officer who played a significant role in the post-Vietnam era reorganization of the U.S. Army
- George Marshall (1781–1855) served in the U.S. Navy during the War of 1812, he was a Master Gunner and wrote Marshall's Practical Marine Gunnery.
- James Megellas – retired United States Army officer, the most decorated officer in the history of the 82nd Airborne Division, received a Distinguished Service Cross, a Silver Star, and been nominated for the Medal of Honor
- Charles Moskos – leading military sociologist in the US Military. Author of Greek Americans: Struggle and Success.
- William Pagonis – retired three-star U.S. Army General and chairman of the board for RailAmerica
- Steve Pisanos – (November 10, 1919 – June 6, 2016) aka "The Flying Greek" - flying ace who served as a fighter pilot with the British Royal Air Force (RAF) and later in the United States Army Air Forces in World War II. He retired in 1974 from the U.S. Air Force as a colonel.
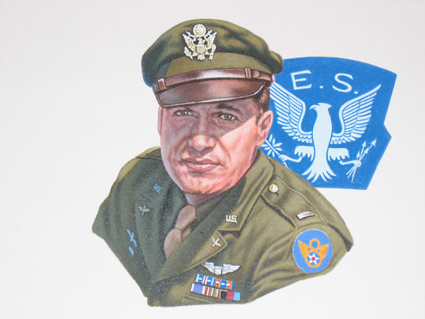
  Steve Pisanos
- Andrew P. Poppas – United States Army lieutenant general currently serving as the director of the Joint Staff
- George Sirian – served in the US Navy with distinction for nearly fifty years
- Alek Skarlatos – US Army National Guard soldier awarded the Soldier's Medal from US President Barack Obama and the Legion of Honor by French President François Hollande for his participation in the thwarting of terrorist train attack on the 2015 Thalys train attack. Portrayed himself in Clint Eastwood's film The 15:17 to Paris (2018).
  US Army National Guard soldier Alek Skarlatos
- James G. Stavridis – retired USN admiral, Supreme Allied Commander Europe July 2, 2009 - May 13, 2013
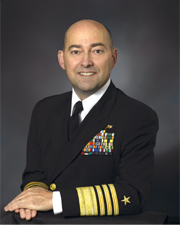
  Admiral James G. Stavridis, former Supreme Allied Commander Europe
- Peter G. Tsouras – retired Lieutenant Colonel in the United States Army

== Politicians ==
=== Federal ===
==== Ιncumbent politicians ====
- Melissa Argyros – U.S. Ambassador to Latvia
- Gus Bilirakis – U.S. Representative from Florida, Republican co-chair of the Congressional Caucus on Hellenic Issues
- Chris Pappas – U.S. Representative from New Hampshire
- Dina Titus – U.S. Representative from Nevada
- John Sarbanes – U.S. Representative from Maryland
- Nicole Malliotakis – U.S. Representative from New York, former New York State assemblywoman (2011–2021)
- Jimmy Patronis – U.S. Representative from Florida, former Chief Financial Officer of Florida (2017–2025) and Florida State Representative (2006–2014)

==== Former politicians ====
- Spiro Agnew – former Vice President of the United States, former governor of Maryland, first Greek-American governor in U.S. history
- Michael Dukakis – former Governor of Massachusetts, 1988 Democratic presidential nominee
- Paul Sarbanes – former U.S. Senator from Maryland; co-sponsored the Sarbanes–Oxley Act on corporate accounting
- Olympia Snowe – former U.S. Senator from Maine, former First Lady of Maine
- Paul Tsongas – former U.S. Senator from Massachusetts
- John E. Sununu – former U.S. Senator from New Hampshire, former U.S. Representative from New Hampshire
- John Brademas – former House Majority Whip, former U.S. Representative from Indiana, former president of New York University, former chair of Federal Reserve Bank of New York.
- John H. Sununu – former White House Chief of Staff under President G.H.W. Bush and former Governor of New Hampshire
- Reince Priebus – former White House Chief of Staff under President Trump, former Chair of Republican National Committee
- Jen Psaki – 34th White House Press Secretary under President Biden, former U.S. Department of State spokesperson under President Obama.
- John Negroponte – U.S. Director of National Intelligence, former U.S. Ambassador to the United Nations
- George Tenet – former U.S. Director of Central Intelligence
- Sylvia Mathews Burwell – former U.S. Secretary of Health and Human Services under President Obama, former U.S. Director of the Office of Management and Budget, former White House Deputy Chief of Staff and president of American University
- Peter Peterson – former U.S. Secretary of Commerce – first Greek-American cabinet officer, head of Blackstone Group
- George Stephanopoulos – political commentator, former Senior Advisor to the President under President Clinton, former White House Communications Director.
- Brian Bulatao – former U.S. Under Secretary of State for Management under President Trump.
- Andrew Manatos – former U.S. Assistant Secretary of Commerce under President Carter
- Michael Bilirakis – former U.S. Representative from Florida.
- Nick Galifianakis – former U.S. Representative from North Carolina
- Peter Kyros – former U.S. Representative from Maine
- Skip Bafalis – former U.S. Representative from Florida
- Nicholas Mavroules – former U.S. Representative from Massachusetts, former mayor of Peabody, Massachusetts
- Gus Yatron – former U.S. Representative from Pennsylvania, and boxer
- George Gekas – former U.S. Representative from Pennsylvania
- Zack Space – former U.S. Representative from Ohio
- Suzanne Kosmas – former U.S. Representative from Florida
- Ron Klink – former U.S. Representative from Pennsylvania
- Michael James Pappas – former U.S. Representative from New Jersey
- Charlie Crist – former U.S. Representative from Florida, former governor of Florida (2007–2011), former Florida attorney general (2003–2007)
- William Antholis – former White House and State Department official, studies the presidency at the University of Virginia
- Jon Favreau – former White House Director of Speechwriting
- George Argyros – former U.S. Ambassador to Spain
- James Costos – former U.S. Ambassador to Spain under Barack Obama.
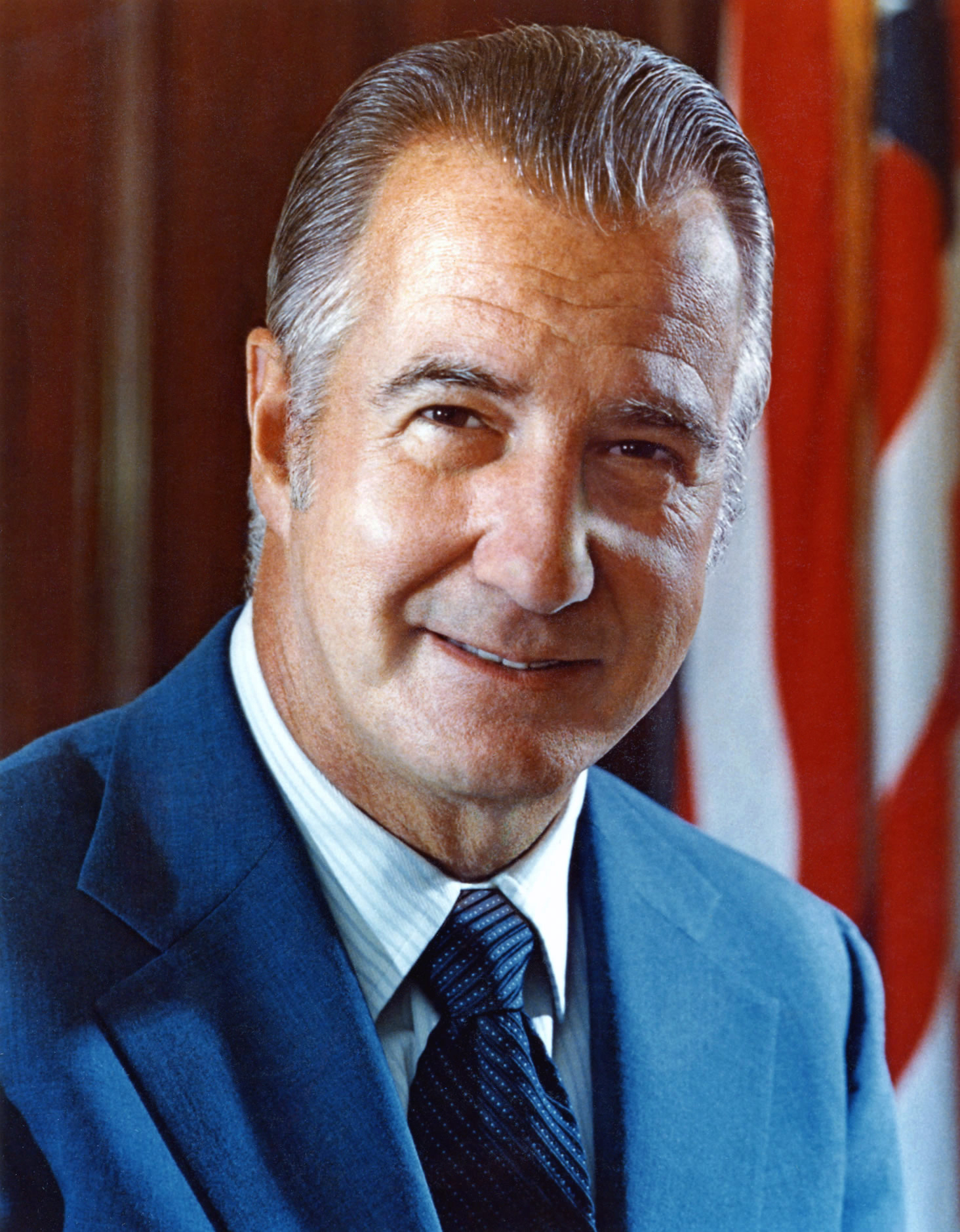
  Spiro Agnew, 39th Vice President of the United States, 1969–1973, under President Richard Nixon
- Alexander Dimitry – diplomat, linguist and scholar who worked as a U.S. Ambassador to Costa Rica and Nicaragua
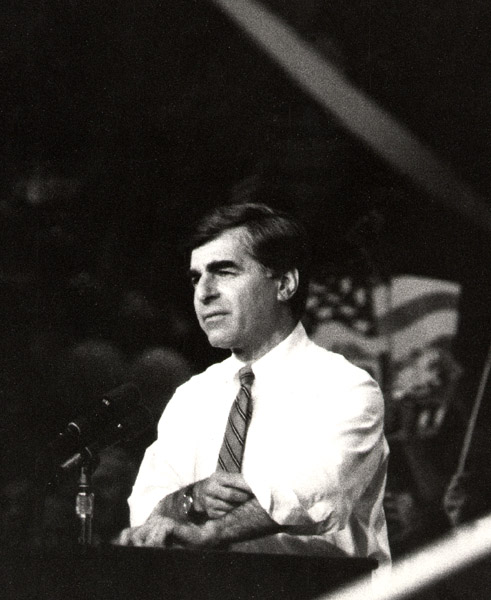
  Michael Dukakis former Governor and 1988 United States presidential election Democratic Party nominee
- George T. Kalaris - CIA head of Counter-intelligence Staff and chief of the Soviet-East Europe Division
- Tom C. Korologos – U.S. Ambassador to Belgium, Reagan lobbyist

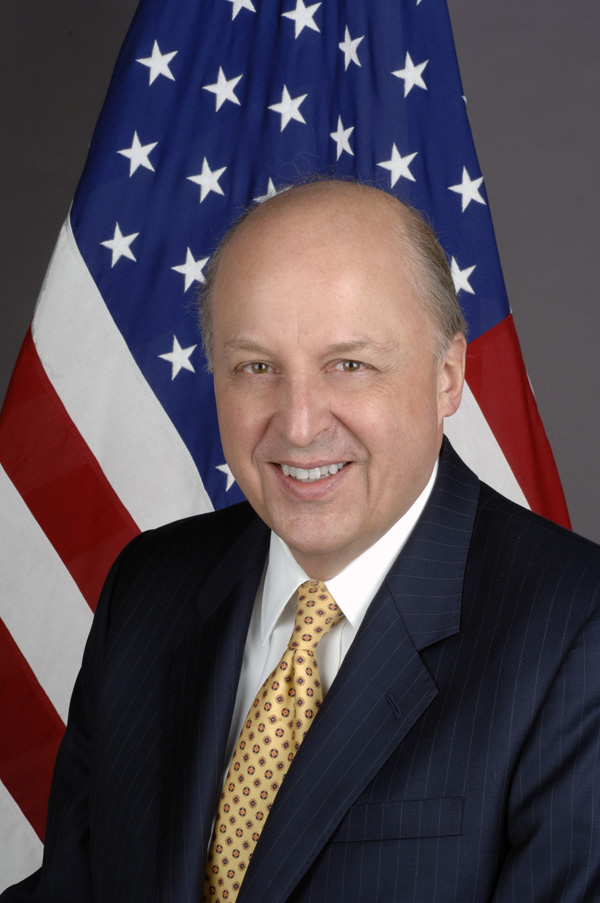
John Negroponte, United States Director of National Intelligence, former United States Ambassador to the United Nations under President George W. Bush

- Gregory Anthony Perdicaris – first U.S. Consul to Greece
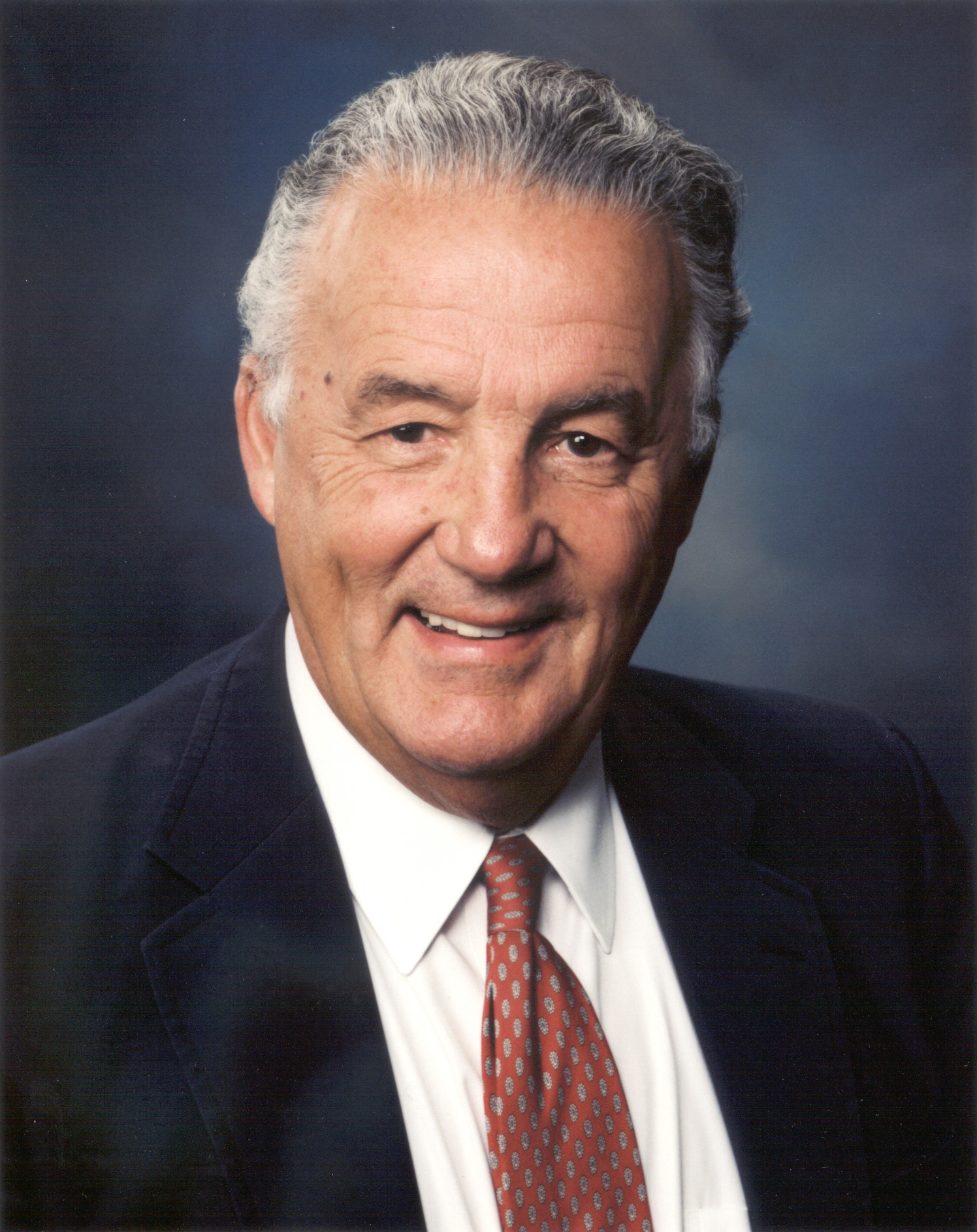
  Former Senator for Maryland; co-sponsor Sarbanes-Oxley Act Paul Sarbanes
- Tasia Scolinos – Justice Department director of public affairs
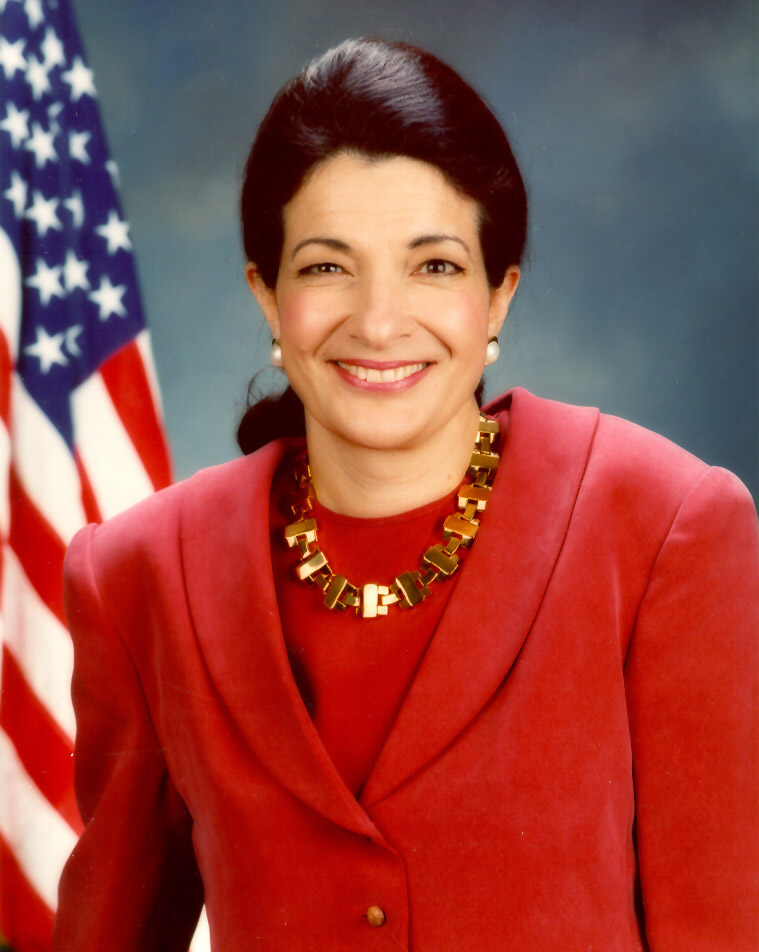
  Senator Olympia Snowe

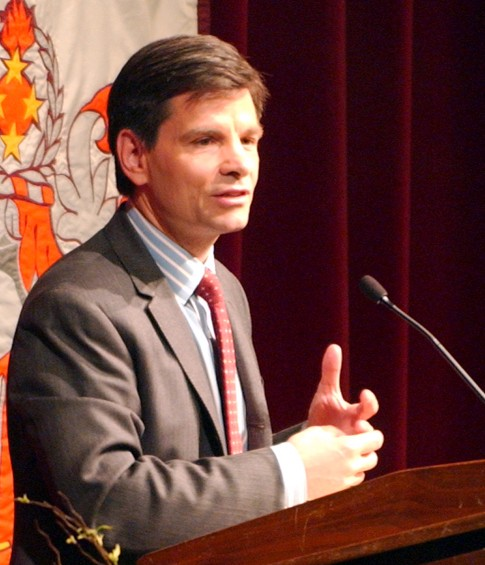
George Stephanopoulos, This Week (ABC TV series) Presenter and former White House Director of Communications and Senior advisor to President Bill Clinton

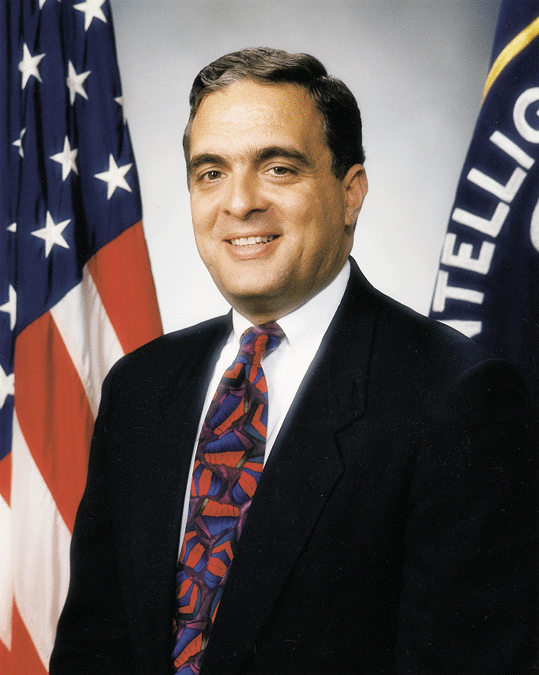
Former CIA Director George Tenet

- Frances Townsend – former assistant to the president and homeland security advisor
- Viron Vaky – former U.S. Ambassador to Costa Rica, Colombia and Venezuela
- John Podesta – Senior Advisor to the President under President Biden, former White House Chief of Staff under President Clinton and campaign director for Hillary Clinton's 2016 presidential run.

=== State ===
==== Incumbent politicians ====
- Michael Gianaris – New York State Senator (2011 to present) from Astoria, NY
- Andrew Gounardes – New York State Senator (2019 to present) from Bay Ridge Brooklyn, NY
- Eleni Kounalakis – Lieutenant Governor of California and former U.S. Ambassador to Hungary (2010–2013)
- Susan Bysiewicz – Lieutenant Governor of Connecticut, former Secretary of the State of Connecticut (1999–2011)
- Stavros Anthony – Lieutenant Governor of Nevada, Las Vegas Councilman
- Alexi Giannoulias – Illinois Secretary of State, former Illinois State Treasurer (2007–2011), 2010 Democratic nominee for U.S. Senate
- Bruce Tarr (Tamvakologos) - Minority Leader of Massachusetts Senate, Massachusetts State Senator, former Massachusetts State Representative (1991–1995)
- John Velis – Massachusetts Senate, Massachusetts State Senator
- Steven Xiarhos – Massachusetts Senate, Massachusetts State Representative
- Denise Garlick – Massachusetts Senate, Massachusetts State Representative
- Sandy Pappas – Minnesota State Senator representing St. Paul, former President of the Minnesota Senate (2013–2017) and former Minnesota State Representative (1985–1991)
- Leonidas Raptakis – Rhode Island State Senator, former Rhode Island State Representative (1993–1997)
- Michael Gianaris – Deputy Majority Leader of New York State Senate, New York State Senator and former New York State Representative (2001–2010)
- James Skoufis – New York State Senator, former New York State Representative (2013–2018)
- Andrew Gounardes – New York State Senator
- Michael Tannousis – New York State Representative
- John Lemondes Jr. – New York State Representative
- Daphne Jordan – New York State Senator
- Andreas Borgeas – California State Senator, former member of the Fresno County Board of Supervisors (2013–2018)
- Eleni Kavros DeGraw – Connecticut State Representative
- Nicole Klarides-Ditria – Connecticut State Representative
- Spiros Mantzavinos – Delaware State Senator
- Leon Stavrinakis – South Carolina State Representative
- Steve Malagari – Pennsylvania State Representative
- Phyllis Katsakiores – New Hampshire State Representative
- Efstathia Booras – New Hampshire State Representative
- Ted Gatsas – Executive Council of New Hampshire, former mayor of Manchester, New Hampshire (2010–2018), former member of New Hampshire Senate (2000–2009)
- Stephan Pappas – Wyoming State Senator
- James C. Condos – Vermont Secretary of State, former Vermont State Senator (2000–2008)
- Michael F. Easley Jr. – United States Attorney for the United States District Court for the Eastern District of North Carolina
- Stacey Travers – Arizona House of Representatives

==== Former politicians ====
- Phil Angelides – former California State Treasurer (1999–2007), 2006 Democratic nominee for governor of California
- Nick Theodore – former Lieutenant Governor of South Carolina (1987–1995)
- George Chanos – former Nevada Attorney General (2005–2007)
- Stephanie Kopelousos – former Secretary of the Florida Department of Transportation (2007–2011)
- Dean Skelos – former New York State Senate member (1985–2015) and the Majority Leader of the New York State Senate (2008, 2011–2015)
- Harry Meshel – former President of the Ohio Senate (1983–1984), former Ohio State Senator (1971–1993)
- Chris Sununu – 82nd Governor of New Hampshire
- Dean Alfange – former Deputy New York Attorney General and founding member of the Liberal Party of New York
- Jim Dabakis – former Utah State Senator (2012–2019), former chairman of the Utah Democratic Party
- Themis Klarides – former Connecticut State Representative, former Minority Leader of the Connecticut House of Representatives (2015–2021)
- Adeline Jay Geo-Karis – former Illinois State Senator (1979–2007), former naval officer
- Theodore Kanavas – former Wisconsin State Senator from Brookfield, Wisconsin (2001–2011)
- John Pappageorge – former Michigan State Senator (2007–2014), former Michigan State Representative (1999–2004), former Oakland County, Michigan Commissioner (1989–1992)
- Phil P. Leventis – former South Carolina State Senator (1980–2012)
- Leah Vukmir-Papachristou – former Wisconsin State Senator (2011–2019), former Wisconsin State Assemblywoman (2002–2011)
- Gale D. Candaras – former Massachusetts State Senator (2007–2015)
- Samuel C. Maragos – former Illinois State Senator (1976–1980), former Illinois State Representative (1969–1976), former Judge of Cook County Circuit Court (1992–1995)
- Johnny Joannou – former Virginia State Senator and Virginia State Delegate (1976–2016)
- Nick Rerras – former Virginia State Senator (2000–2008)
- Harry Meshel – former Ohio State Senator (1971–1993)
- Nicholas C. Petris – former California State Senator (1966–1996)
- Jim Aslanides – former Ohio State Representative (1999–2008)
- Nicholas Kafoglis – former Kentucky State Senator (1988–1998), former Kentucky State Representative (1972–1976)
- Lou Papan – former California State Assemblyman (1996-2002, 1973–1986)
- Dimitri Polizos – former Alabama State Representative (2013–2019)
- Demetrius Atsalis – former Massachusetts State Representative (1999–2013)
- James Bacalles – former New York State Assemblyman (1995–2010)
- Elaine Alquist – former California State Assemblyman (1996-2002, 2004–2012)
- Larry Chatzidakis – former New Jersey Assemblyman (1997–2008)
- Frank Skartados – former New York State Assemblyman (2012-2018, 2009–2010)
- Theodore J. Sophocleus – former Maryland State Delegate (1999-2018, 1993–1995)
- Joyce Spiliotis – former Massachusetts State Representative (2003–2012)
- Sandra M. Pihos – former Illinois State Representative (2003–2015)
- Matthew Mirones – former New York State Assemblyman (2002–2006)
- Theodore C. Speliotis – former Massachusetts State Representative (1979-1987, 1997–2021)
- Gery Chico – former Chair of the Illinois State Board of Education (2011–2015)
- Mary P. Easley – former First Lady of North Carolina (2001–2009)

=== Local ===
- Dean Trantalis – mayor of Fort Lauderdale, former city commissioner for Fort Lauderdale (2013–2018)
- Bill Saffo – mayor of Wilmington, North Carolina
- Maria Pappas – Cook County treasurer.
- Ted Venetoulis – former Executive of Baltimore County
- Art Agnos – former mayor of San Francisco
- George Christopher – former mayor of San Francisco
- Mike Pantelides – former mayor of Annapolis
- John Rousakis – former mayor of Savannah, Georgia
- Helen Boosalis – former mayor of Lincoln, Nebraska
- P. Pete Chalos – second-longest-serving mayor in the history of Terre Haute, Indiana
- George Cretekos – former mayor of Clearwater, Florida
- George Harlamon – former mayor of Waterbury, Connecticut
- David Scondras – former member of the Boston City Council
- George Pandely former New Orleans assistant alderman (1853, 1868–1870) and locomotive supervisor

== Science and academia ==
=== Academic administration ===
- Dennis Assanis – academic administrator, scientist, engineer and author, 28th president of the University of Delaware
- Constantine W. Curris – educator, former president of the American Association of State Colleges and Universities
- James S. Economou – physician-scientist and university officer, currently the Vice Chancellor for Research at the University of California, Los Angeles
- Peter Liacouras – former president of Temple University
- C. L. Max Nikias – engineer and president of the University of Southern California
- Constantine Papadakis – president of Drexel University
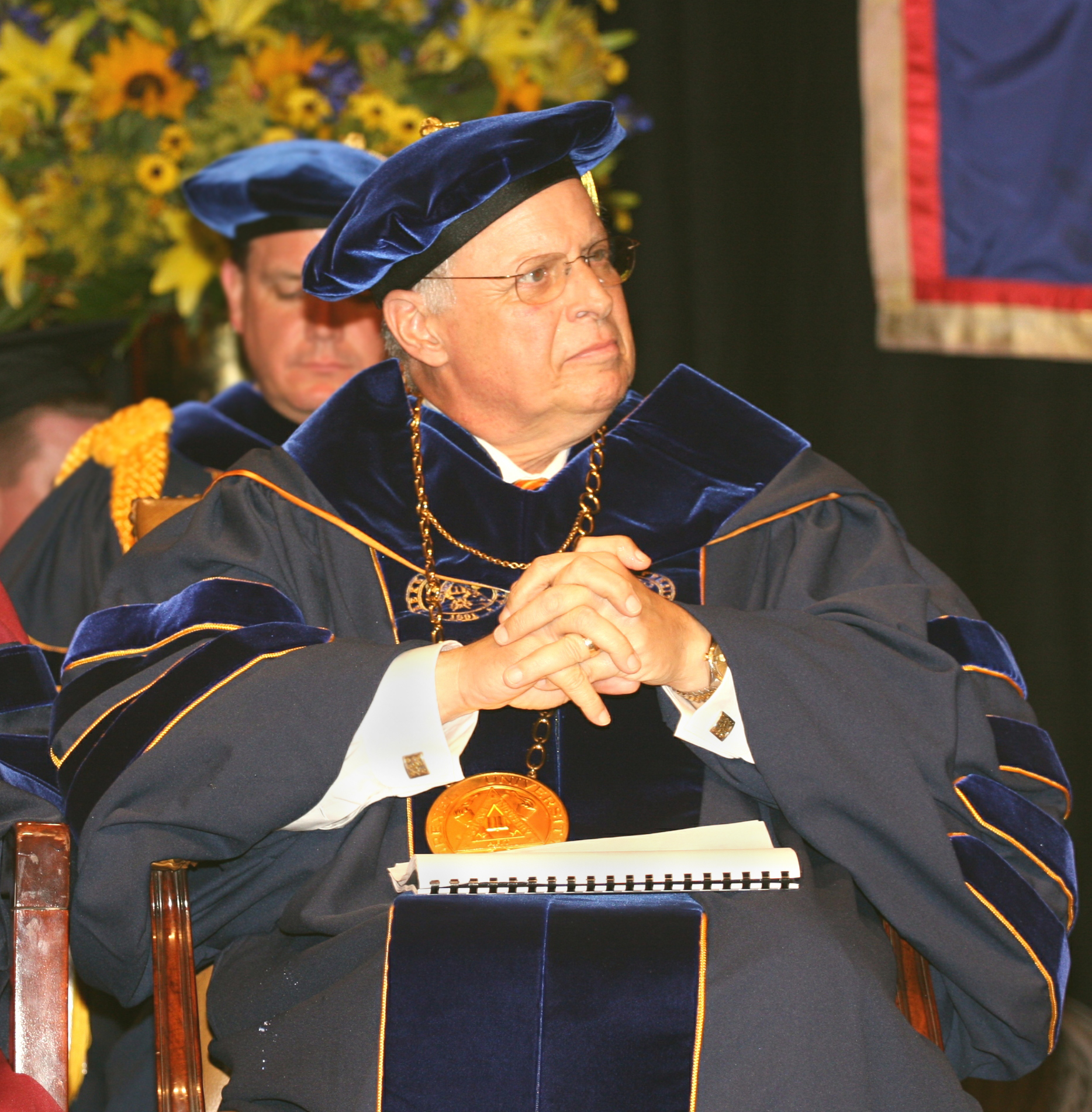
  Constantine Papadakis, former President of Drexel University
- Symeon C. Symeonides – current dean of Willamette University College of Law
- Armand Paul Alivisatos – chemist, 14th president of the University of Chicago
- Arthur C. Vailas – 12th president of Idaho State University

=== Anthropology ===
- Dorothy D. Lee – anthropologist, author and philosopher of cultural anthropology
- Jorja Manos Leap - anthropologist, author and educator

=== Biology - genetics ===
- Constantine John Alexopoulos – mycologist
- Manolis Kellis – genomics, computational biology, AI
- Tom Maniatis – biologist
- Aristides Patrinos – geneticist, biological, electrical and chemical engineer, Human Genome Project
- George Yancopoulos – biomedical scientist, chief scientific officer of Regeneron Pharmaceuticals
- Panayiotis Zavos – geneticist

=== Chemistry ===
- Paul Anastas – chemist
- Paul Alivisatos – nanotechnologist
- Kyriacos Costa Nicolaou – chemist

=== Computer science ===
- Saul Amarel – artificial intelligence pioneer
- Sebastian Condyles - Computer Science student in the engineering school at the University of Virginia
- Michael Dertouzos – innovator and director of the M.I.T. LCS
- Paris Kanellakis – computer scientist
- Christos Papadimitriou – professor of computer science at University of California, Berkeley
- Katia Sycara – professor in the Robotics Institute, School of Computer Science at Carnegie Mellon University
- Demetri Terzopoulos – computer scientist
- Mihalis Yannakakis – computer scientist

=== Economics-management ===
- Chris Argyris – distinguished lifetime contributor to theory and practice of management
- John Geanakoplos – economist, James Tobin Professor of Economics at Yale University
- Dimitri B. Papadimitriou – economist, author, and college professor

=== Engineering ===
- Constantine A. Balanis – electrical engineer
- John Baras – electrical engineer
- George Doundoulakis – physicist and soldier who worked under British Intelligence during World War II and then served with the OSS in Thessaly, Greece. He is known by his twenty-six US patents in the fields of radar, electronics, and narrowband television.
- Helias Doundoulakis – civil engineer who was employed at Grumman Aerospace Corporation for over thirty five years and group leader on many USAF and NASA projects. These included the Apollo space missions and the Lunar Excursion Module, the F-14 Tomcat fighter jet, and the Space Shuttle. His design of the oxygen tanks on the ill-fated Apollo 13 mission was instrumental in the return of the Apollo 13 crew, for which Doundoulakis was given a plaque by Captain James Lovell, Fred Haise, and Jack Swigert. Served in the United States Army and the Office of Strategic Services (OSS) — as a spy during the Battle of Crete in WWII.
- Maria Flytzani-Stephanopoulos – chemical engineer
- Peter Karter – nuclear engineer and one of the pioneers of the modern recycling industry
- Ares J. Rosakis – engineer
- George Tchobanoglous – civil and environmental engineer, professor at University of California, Davis
- Michael Tsapatsis – chemical engineer and materials scientist

=== English, debate, speech ===
- Helena Zachos (March 5, 1856 – February 28, 1951) - American college professor and elocutionist, who was on the faculty at Cooper Union from 1897 to 1939. Daughter of educator and abolitionist Professor John Celivergos Zachos.

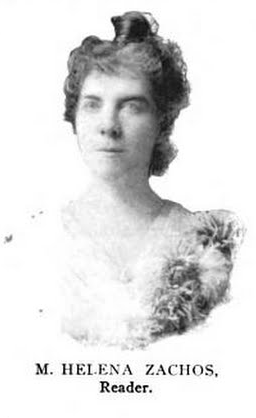
HelenaZachos

- John Celivergos Zachos (December 20, 1820 – March 20, 1898) - worked as Library Curator and Professor of English Language at Cooper Union from 1872 until his death in 1898. In 1861 was named the first superintendent of the Port Royal Experiment where freed slaves were educated on the liberated islands off of Charleston, SC.

=== History ===
- Deno Geanakoplos – Bradford Durfee Professor Emeritus of Byzantine History, Renaissance History, and Eastern Orthodox Church History at Yale University.

=== Law ===
- George Anastaplo – professor at Loyola University Chicago School of Law
- George C. Christie – James B. Duke emeritus professor of law at Duke University School of Law in Durham, North Carolina
- Nicholas Tsoucalas – United States Judge of the United States Court of International Trade

=== Mathematics ===
- Tom M. Apostol – analytic number theorist and professor at the California Institute of Technology
- Persi Diaconis – mathematician
- James Dugundji – mathematician, professor of mathematics at the University of Southern California
- George Karniadakis – applied mathematician and engineer
- Panayotis G. Kevrekidis – applied mathematician
- Spyros Simos Magliveras - mathematics and computer science
- George C. Papanicolaou – mathematician
- Athanasios Papoulis – engineer and applied mathematician
- John Allen Paulos – mathematician
- E.C. Zachmanoglou - mathematician, professor and co-chair of Math Department at Purdue University
- Thaleia Zariphopoulou – mathematician

=== Medicine ===
- George Canellos – oncologist and cancer researcher
- John Ioannidis – physician
- Albert Levis – psychiatrist and philosopher
- Christos Socrates Mantzoros – physician scientist, internist - endocrinologist, Harvard Medical School professor and the editor-in-chief of the journal Metabolism: Clinical and Experimental
- George Papanicolaou – created the pap test, and more generally, the field of cytopathology

=== Philosophy ===
- Diogenes Allen – professor of philosophy
- Alexander Nehamas – professor of philosophy

=== Physics ===
- George A. Economou – optical systems expert
- John Joannopoulos – physicist
- Menas Kafatos – quantum physicist
- Paul Kalas – astronomer
- Efthimios Kaxiras – condensed matter physicist
- Stamatios Krimigis – space physics and instrumentation
- Nicholas Metropolis – physicist
- Andreas Gerasimos Michalitsianos – NASA astrophysicist
- Dimitris Nanopoulos – professor of theoretical physics at TAMU
- Costas N. Papanicolas – physicist
- Costas Soukoulis – professor of physics at Iowa State University
- Maria Spiropulu – experimental physicist, member of the CMS collaboration that found the Higgs boson particle
- Tom Ypsilantis – physicist
- Cosmas Zachos – physicist

=== Psychology ===
- Richard Boyatzis - organizational theorist and Distinguished University Professor in the Departments of Organizational Behavior, Psychology, and Cognitive Science at Case Western Reserve University. He is considered an expert in the field of emotional intelligence, behavior change and competence.
- Leda Cosmides – psychologist
- Effie Geanakoplos – former researcher at the Yale Depression Unit and clinical instructor in social work at the Child Study Center at Yale University, and psychiatric social worker.
- Matina Horner – psychologist, sixth president of Radcliffe College

=== Sociology ===
- John Asimakopoulos – professor of sociology at the City University of New York-Bronx
- Nicholas A. Christakis – sociologist and physician
- Panos Bardis – sociologist

=== Various ===
- George Avery (professor) – professor for German Studies at Swarthmore College
- Gust Avrakotos – political adviser
- Kyriacos A. Athanasiou – biomedical engineer
- Lambros D. Callimahos – NSA cryptanalyst
- Harry J. Cargas – scholar, author, and teacher best known for his writing and research on the Holocaust, Jewish-Catholic relations, and American literature
- Alexander Coucoulas – inventor, research engineer, and author
- Raphael Demos – Alford Professor of Natural Religion, Moral Philosophy and Civil Polity, emeritus, at Harvard University
- Deno Geanakoplos – renowned scholar of Byzantine history, Bradford Durfee professor emeritus at Yale University.
- Sabine Iatridou – linguist
- Ernest Lagarde - chair of modern languages and English literature at Mount St. Mary's University (1869-1914)
- Maria Mavroudi – distinguished philologist, historian, and professor of Byzantine Studies at the University of California, Berkeley
- Nicholas Negroponte – scientist, MIT Media Lab founder and director; architect
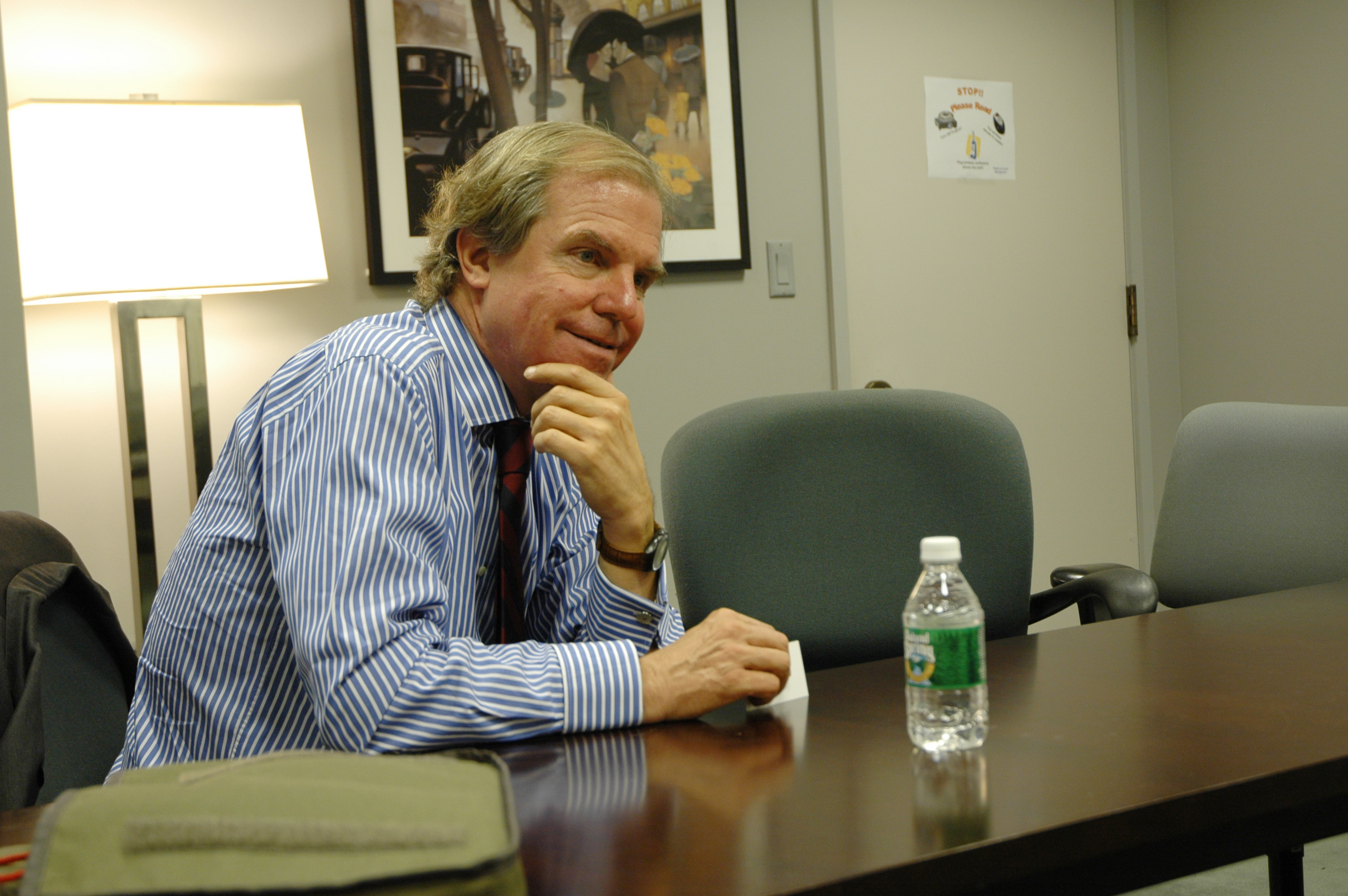
  Nicholas Negroponte, MIT Media Lab Director and Founder
- C. A. Patrides – academic and writer, and "one of the greatest scholars of Renaissance literature of his generation"
- Nicholas A. Peppas – chaired professor in engineering, University of Texas at Austin
- Mary Tsingou – physicist and mathematician, known for being one of the first programmers on the MANIAC computer at Los Alamos National Laboratory
- William V. Spanos – distinguished Professor of English and comparative literature at Binghamton University
- Marius Vassiliou – computational physicist and aerospace executive

== Sports ==
=== Aquatics ===
- Greg Louganis – Olympic diving champion (Greek by adoption; ethnically Samoan and Swedish)
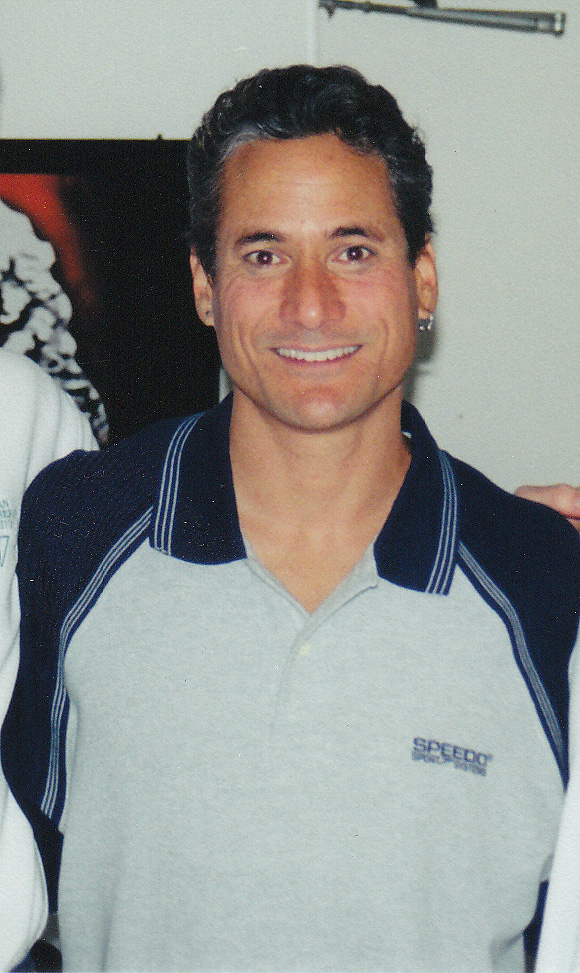
  Olympic diver winner Greg Louganis
- Christina Loukas – Olympic diver

=== Baseball ===
- Harry "the Golden Greek" Agganis – Boston University's first-ever football All-American and professional baseball player for the Boston Red Sox.
- Peter Angelos – MLB owner of the Baltimore Orioles and former basketball player.
- Alex Anthopoulos – GM of Atlanta Braves and former GM of Toronto Blue Jays.
- Annastasia Batikis – played in the All-American Girls Professional Baseball League in 1945
- Jim Baxes - Dimitrios Speros "Jim" Baxes (1928-1996) was a second baseman and third baseman in the MLB. He played for the Los Angeles Dodgers and the Cleveland Indians. Brother of Mike Maxes.
- Mike Baxes - Michael Baxes (1930-2023) played as a second baseman and shortstop for the Kansas City Athletics in the 1950s. Brother of Jim Baxes.
- Clay Bellinger – MLB played for the New York Yankees and Anaheim Angels
- Cody Bellinger – All-Star Outfielder for Los Angeles Dodgers and National League Rookie of the Year in 2017.
- Cole Bellinger – Pitcher. 2017 draft pick of San Diego Padres
- Tim Birtsas - Pitcher for Cincinnati Reds and Oakland Athletics
- Peter Bourjos – MLB outfielder for Los Angeles Angels, St. Louis Cardinals, Tampa Bay Rays and Atlanta Braves.
- Al Campanis – MLB player and executive of the Los Angeles Dodgers
- Jim Campanis - MLB player for Los Angeles Dodgers, Kansas City Royals and Pittsburgh Pirates. Son of Al Campanis.
- Bob Chakales - pitcher for 5 different MLB teams between 1951-57.
- Ria Cortesio – professional baseball umpire
- Angelo Dagres - played for Baltimore Orioles for one month, September 1955.
- Jim Essian - catcher for 5 different MLB teams between 1973-84. Was manager of Greek National Baseball Team.
- Charles Peter "Greek" George - catcher from 1935-45 for 4 MLB teams.
- George Glinatsis - pitched briefly for Seattle Mariners in 1994.
- Alex Grammas – MLB manager and infielder for St. Louis Cardinals, Cincinnati Reds and the Chicago Cubs.
- Alex Kampouris - 1st Greek American to play in MLB. 2B/3B, played for 4 MLB teams between 1934-43.
- Eric Karros – former MLB player for the Los Angeles Dodgers, and now a baseball broadcaster
- Gus Keriazakos - pitcher for 3 MLB teams between 1950-55.
- Bobby Kingsbury – MLB player for the Pittsburgh Pirates
- Chris Kitsos - SS played in 1 inning of an MLB game for Chicago Cubs in 1954. 13 years in minor leagues.
- George Kontos – MLB pitcher with the San Francisco Giants
- Paul Kostacopoulos – Head baseball coach at U.S. Naval Academy in Annapolis, MD
- George Kottaras – catcher for 7 MLB teams including: Milwaukee Brewers, Oakland Athletics, Kansas City Royals and Cleveland Indians.
- Andrew Lambo - OF/1B for Oakland and Pittsburgh from 2013-16.
- Chris Lemonis – Head coach of Mississippi State Bulldogs baseball.
- Kay Lionikas – played in the All-American Girls Professional Baseball League from 1948–1950
- Billy Loes – MLB Pitcher for the Dodgers, Baltimore Orioles and San Francisco Giants from 1950-61.
- Nick Markakis – MLB outfielder who currently plays for the Atlanta Braves
- Tino Martinez – former MLB first baseman for the N.Y. Yankees (Greek mother)
- Aaron Miles – MLB player for the St. Louis Cardinals, Chicago White Sox, and Colorado Rockies (paternal grandmother)
- Daniel Moskos - pitcher for Pittsburgh Pirates and pitching coach for Chicago Cubs and Miami Marlins.
- Mike Moustakas – MLB player for the Kansas City Royals
- Pete Naktenis - pitcher for 2 teams between 1936-39.
- Gus Niarhos – MLB Yankees, White Sox, Red Sox, Phillies
- Erik Pappas – MLB catcher for the Chicago Cubs and the St. Louis Cardinals.
- Milt Pappas – MLB pitcher for the Baltimore Orioles and Cincinnati Reds and other teams
- Chris Pelekoudas - MLB umpire from 1960-75. Father of Lee Pelekoudas.
- Lee Pelekoudas - MLB executive for Seattle Mariners and son of Chris Pelekoudas.
- June Peppas – All-American Girls Professional Baseball League 1948–1954
- Kevin Pickford - pitched for San Diego Padres in 2002.
- Lou Skizas – MLB player for NY Yankees (1956), Kansas City Athletics (1956–57), Detroit Tigers (1958), Chicago White Sox (1959)
- Sean Spencer - pitched for 2 teams between 1999-2000. Pitched for Greek National Baseball team in 2004 Olympics.
- George Theodore – MLB outfielder for the New York Mets
- Mike Tonis - catcher for Kansas City Royals in 2004.
- Gus Triandos – MLB player for the Baltimore Orioles and other teams
- George Tsamis - MLB pitcher for Minnesota Twins in 1993. Minor league manager of multiple teams.
- John Tsitouris - MLB pitcher for 3 teams between 1957–68
- Clint Zavaras – MLB pitcher with the Seattle Mariners in 1989. He pitched for Greek National Baseball team in 2004 Olympics.

=== Basketball ===
- Giannis Antetokounmpo – Professional player in the NBA for the Miami Heat
- Zach Auguste – Notre Dame Fighting Irish college and also professional basketball player
- Michael Bramos – basketballer, member of the Greek national basketball team
- Nick Calathes – former Florida Gators basketball player, and professional player
- Pat Calathes – professional basketball player
- Pavlos Diakoulas – former professional basketball player
- Tyler Dorsey (born 1996) - basketball player in the Israeli Basketball Premier League
- Angelo Drossos – owner of the San Antonio Spurs basketball team from 1973 to 1988 (NBA Executive of the Year Award in 1978)
- Nick Galis – former professional basketball player, played in Europe (where he is known as Nikos Galis), and regarded as one of Europe's all-time basketball greats
- Steve Giatzoglou – former professional basketball player
- George Kastrinakis – former professional basketball player in Greece
- John Korfas – former professional basketball player
- Kosta Koufos – professional basketball player for the Sacramento Kings in the NBA and the Greece men's national basketball team
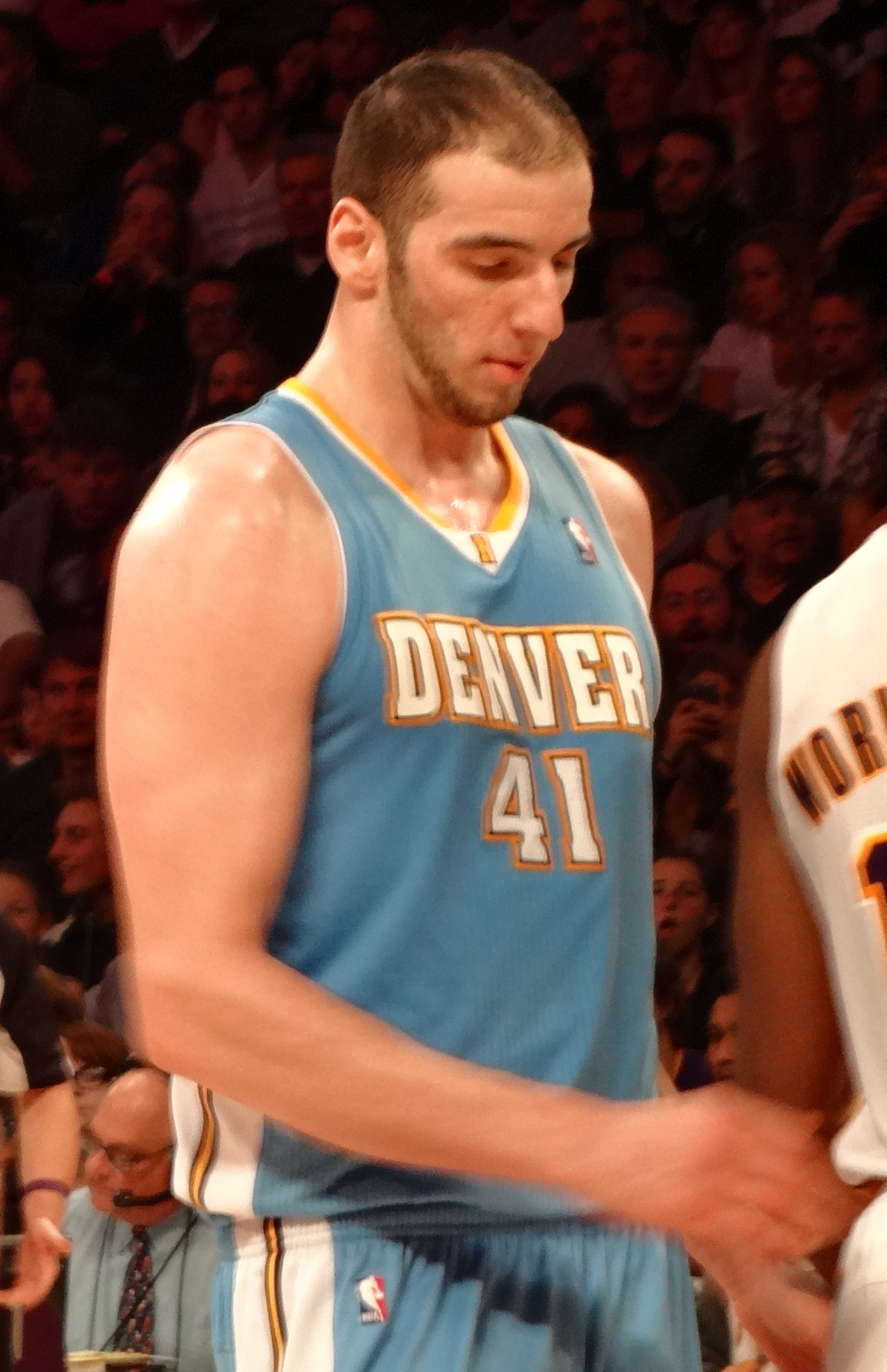
  Kostas Koufos, professional basketball player for Sacramento Kings
- Steve Lappas – former college basketball coach at Villanova and UMass
- Ted Manakas – shooting guard for the Princeton Tigers men's basketball team under coach Pete Carril; played briefly in NBA for Kansas City-Omaha Kings
- Nick Paulos – professional basketball player
- Kurt Rambis – former NBA professional basketball player, won 4 championships with the L.A. Lakers (birth name Kyriakos Rambidis)
- Chris Roupas – former Greek American Professional Basketball Player, First Penn State Nittany Lion to play professional basketball in Greece
- David Stergakos – former professional Greek basketball player
- Jake Tsakalidis – former NBA player for Phoenix Suns, Memphis Grizzlies and Houston Rockets.
- Lou Tsioropoulos – former NBA professional basketball player with the Boston Celtics

=== Body building and fitness training ===
- John Sitaras – fitness professional, creator of the Sitaras method and founder of Sitaras Fitness in New York City
- Craig Titus – American bodybuilder
- Christos Nikitas Poulis - athletic trainer

=== Boxing ===
- Anton Christoforidis – professional boxer, NBA World Light Heavyweight Champion 1941
- Michael Katsidis – (born in Australia) current boxer
- Pete Spanakos - retired bantamweight boxer identical twin of Nikos Spanakos bronze metal 1959 Chicago PanAm Games
- Nikos Spanakos - retired flyweight boxer identical twin of Pete Spanakos 1960 Rome Olympic Games

=== Football ===
- Harry "the Golden Greek" Agganis^{1} - college football star and 1st-ever All-American at Boston University. Drafted by the Cleveland Browns but turned down the offer to play baseball for the Boston Red Sox.
- Steve Alexakos – played OL in college for San Jose State and then NFL for Denver Broncos (1970) and New York Giants (1971).
- Dee Andros (born Demosthenes Konstandies "Dee" Andrecopoulos) - American football player, coach, and college athletics administrator. Brother of Plato Andros.
- Plato Andros (Plato Gus Andrecopoulos) - college All-American guard for the University of Oklahoma. He played four years in the NFL for the Chicago Cardinals. Brother of Dee Andros.
- Zach Collaros – quarterback for the University of Cincinnati football team
- Jim Eliopulos – NFL player for the New York Jets
- Chris Farasopoulos – NFL player, played for the New York Jets
- Alex Holmes – NFL tight end for the St. Louis Rams, mother is Greek
- George Karlaftis - NFL player with the Kansas City Chiefs
- Alex Karras – NFL player with the Detroit Lions, wrestler and actor
- Lou Karras – NFL player with the Washington Redskins, eldest brother of Alex Karras
- Ted Karras – NFL player with the Chicago Bears and Detroit Lions. Won NFL championship with 1963 Bears. Older brother of Alex Karras
- Ted Karras Jr. - NFL player and Super Bowl champion for 1987 Washington Redskins
- Ted Karras III - Center for Cincinnati Bengals and New England Patriots. Played in 3 consecutive Super Bowls for Patriots, winning 2 championships (2016 & 2018).
- Jim Karsatos – Ohio State QB in 1980s
- Niko Koutouvides – NFL linebacker for the Seattle Seahawks, Tampa Bay Buccaneers, Denver Broncos and New England Patriots
- Bill Mackrides – QB for the Philadelphia Eagles. He led them to 2 NFL championships in 1948 and 1949.
- Chris Maragos – NFL safety for two Super Bowl champions: 2013 Seattle Seahawks and 2017 Philadelphia Eagles.

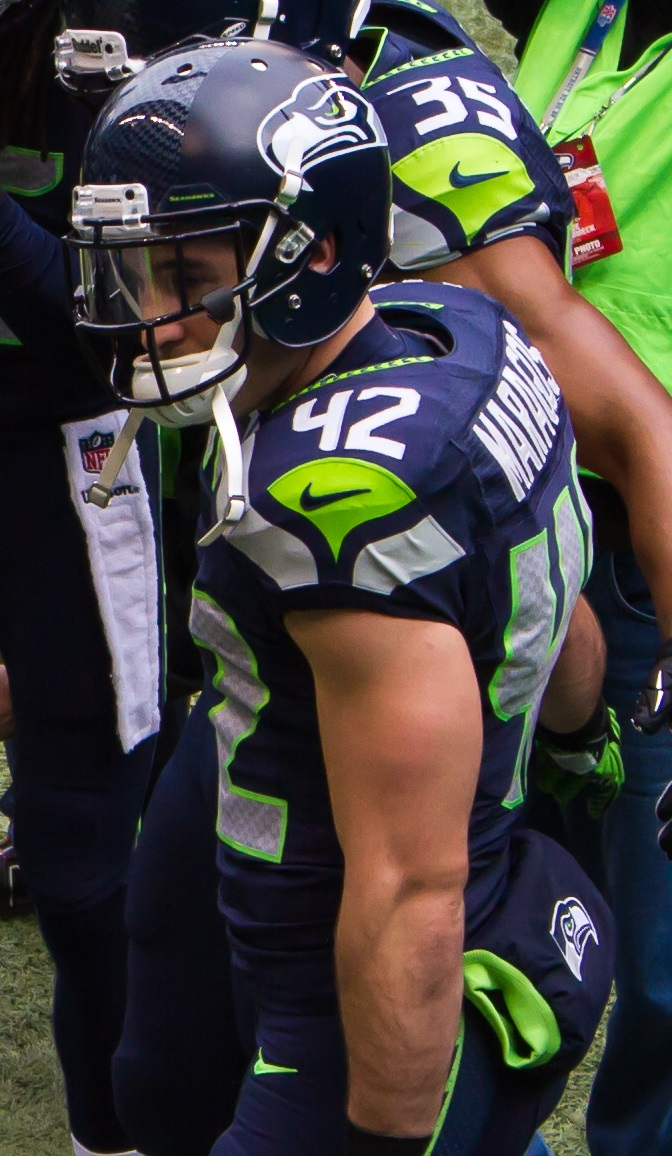
Chris Maragos, NFL safety for the Seattle Seahawks

- Archie Matsos (Archimidis Matsos) - All-American linebacker at Michigan State in 1950s. Played in the AFL (pre-merger) for the Buffalo Bills, Oakland Raiders, Denver Broncos and San Diego Chargers.
- Joe Panos – NFL player with the Philadelphia Eagles and Buffalo Bills 1994–2000 (birth name Zois Panagiotopoulos)
- Petros Papadakis – host of various sports shows on radio, former college football tailback and team captain at USC 1996–2000.
- Tony Pashos – former NFL offensive lineman for six teams, including with the Baltimore Ravens and Jacksonville Jaguars.
- Lonie Paxton – NFL New England Patriots long-snapper 2001–2003
- Peter Philipakos – Soccer player, formerly of Olympiacos F.C.
- Pete Pihos – NFL player with the Philadelphia Eagles (Pro Football Hall of Fame). Is the only NFL player to have been named All-Pro on both offense and defense in the same year.
- Gene Rossides – Star QB who presided over the Golden Era of Columbia Football of 1945–48. Drafted by [New York Giants] in 1949. Protégé of Sid Luckman.
- Fred Smerlas – NFL player for the Buffalo Bills and the New England Patriots
- Alex Spanos – NFL owner of the San Diego Chargers
- A. G. Spanos – named President of Business Operations for the San Diego Chargers in 2015. Grandson of Alex Spanos.
  A. G. Spanos (left), President of Business Operations for the San Diego Chargers
- Dean Spanos – President and CEO of San Diego Chargers. Son of Alex Spanos.
- Frank Stams {Stamoulis} - defensive lineman for University of Notre Dame, including their 1988 National Championship team. He was converted to linebacker in the NFL, where he played for the Los Angeles Rams, Cleveland Browns and Kansas City Chiefs.
- Matt Stover – NFL player, kicker for Baltimore Ravens
- Harry Theofiledes – backup QB for Washington Redskins in 1968.
- Garo Yepremian – NFL player (Greek Cypriot origin)
- Gust Zarnas – NFL player with the Chicago Bears and Green Bay Packers 1938–1940

=== Gambling, bookmakers, poker ===
- Steve Billirakis – Bracelet winner in the World Series of Poker
- Nick "the Greek" Dandolos^{1} - one of the most famous players in the history of poker
- Sam Mastrogiannis – Bracelet winner in the World Series of Poker
- Billy Pappas – poker player and world champion foosball player
- Athanasios Polychronopoulos – Bracelet winner in the World Series of Poker
- Chris Tsiprailidis – Bracelet winner in the World Series of Poker
- Jimmy "the Greek" Snyder James George Snyder Sr. (born Dimetrios Georgios Synodinos, September 9, 1918 – April 21, 1996) - American sports commentator and Las Vegas oddsmaker.

=== Goalball ===
- Eliana Mason - American goalball bronze medalist

=== Hockey ===
- Tom Anastos – Head Hockey Coach, Michigan State University
- Andreas Athanasiou – currently plays Center for the Detroit Red Wings.
- Adam Burish – NHL player with the Dallas Stars
- Jimmy Carson – NHL hockey player (original family surname Kyriazopoulos)
- Chris Chelios – Hockey Hall of Fame hockey player for the Montreal Canadiens, Chicago Black Hawks and Detroit Red Wings.
- Jake Chelios – NHL hockey player. Son of Chris Chelios.
- Cleon Daskalakis – NHL goaltender for Boston Bruins 1984–87.
- Peter Douris – played in NHL 1985 to 1998 for the Winnipeg Jets, Boston Bruins, Mighty Ducks of Anaheim and Dallas Stars.
- Nick Fotiu – NHL 1973–1990, played for the New York Rangers, Hartford Whalers, Calgary Flames, Philadelphia Flyers and Edmonton Oilers.
- Bob Halkidis – Between 1985 and 2001 he played for six NHL Teams.
- Krys Kolanos – NHL center for Phoenix Coyotes, Edmonton Oilers, Minnesota Wild, and Calgary Flames.
- Chris Kontos – former NHL player known for his prolific scoring in the play-offs
- Tom Kostopoulos – NHL hockey player for six teams including the Los Angeles Kings
- Chris Kotsopoulos – NHL defenseman between 1978 and 1990. He played for New York Rangers, Hartford Whalers, Toronto Maple Leafs and Detroit Red Wings.
- Nick Kypreos – played in NHL (1986–1997) for the Washington Capitals, Hartford Whalers, New York Rangers and Toronto Maple Leafs
- George Parros – NHL hockey player
- Steve Staios – NHL hockey player
- Nikos Tselios – AHL hockey player. Cousin of Chris Chelios.
- Trevor Zegras – NHL hockey player for the Philadelphia Flyers.

=== Mixed martial arts ===
- John Critzos II – martial arts fighter, champion, and instructor
- Alex Karalexis – professional fighter with the Ultimate Fighting Championship
- Christos Giagos - professional fighter with the Ultimate Fighting Championship

=== Motor sports ===
- Art Arfons – world land speed record holder
- George Constantine – racing driver
- Chris Karamesines – drag racer and one of NHRA's early pioneers
- Danny Kladis – race car driver
- Andy Papathanassiou – pit crew coach
- Alex Tremulis – industrial designer of the Tucker (Automobile Hall of Fame)
- Alex Xydias – influential figure in the early days of the auto racing sport involving hot rods
- Emanuel Zervakis – NASCAR driver and team owner

=== Soccer / association football ===
- Andreas Chronis – professional football player
- George John – soccer player, currently with Major League Soccer club New York City FC
- Gus Kartes – former Chicago Storm footballer
- Noah Allen – professional soccer player
- Frank Klopas – retired soccer player, formerly of AEK Athens, Apollon Athens, Kansas City Wizards, Chicago Fire and the U.S. national team
- Alexi Lalas – retired soccer; played for the L.A. Galaxy and U.S. national team
- John Limniatis – Canadian retired professional soccer player. He played 44 times and scored one goal for the Canadian national team, also captaining and later becoming the head coach of the Montreal Impact.
- Peter Skouras – retired soccer player, formerly of Olympiacos, PAOK, San Diego Sockers of the North American Soccer League, and United States Youth National Teams

=== Surfing ===
- Laird Hamilton – Big wave surfer. Born Laird John Zerfas. Greek father.
- Caroline Marks – World Surf League professional surfer (ranked No. 8 internationally in 2018)

=== Tennis ===
- Eleni Rossides
- Pete Sampras – tennis player, considered one of the best tennis players in history
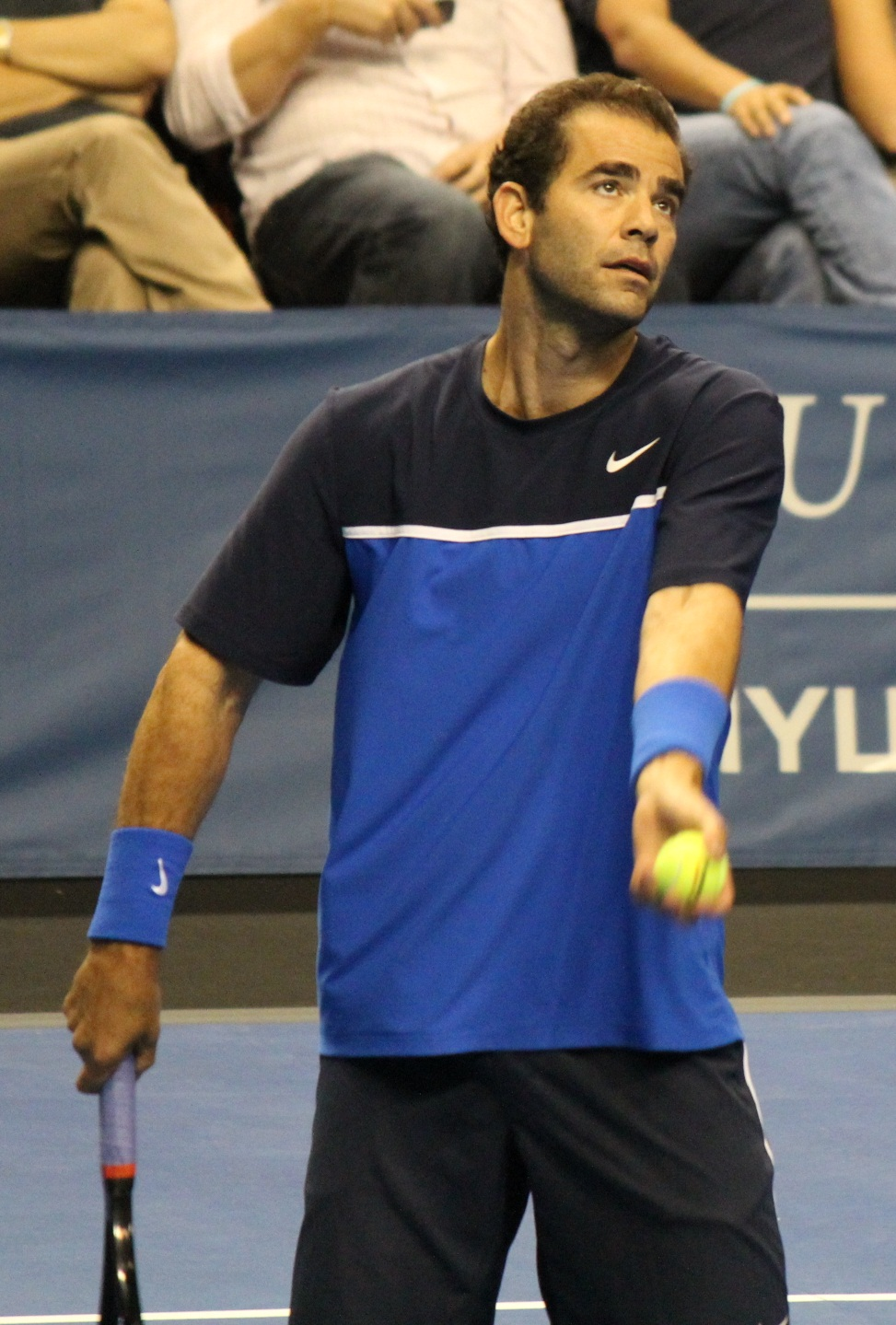
  Pete Sampras, tennis player, first man to win 14 Grand Slam titles

=== Track and field ===
- Dean Karnazes – ultramarathon champion, writer, businessman
- Bob Mathias - decathlete. Won 2 Olympic gold medals: London (1948) and Helsinki (1952). Became younger gold medal winner (age 17) in 1948.
- Tom Pappas – track & field decathlete, 2003 world decathlon champion and 2-time Olympian.

=== Winter sports ===
- Tara Dakides – pro snowboarder and champion from California
- Themistocles Leftheris – American pair skater, 2007 U.S. National Pairs bronze medalist
- Evan Lysacek - American figure skater

=== Wrestling ===
- David Batista (Bautista) - former WWE professional wrestler (Greek mother and Filipino father) and actor
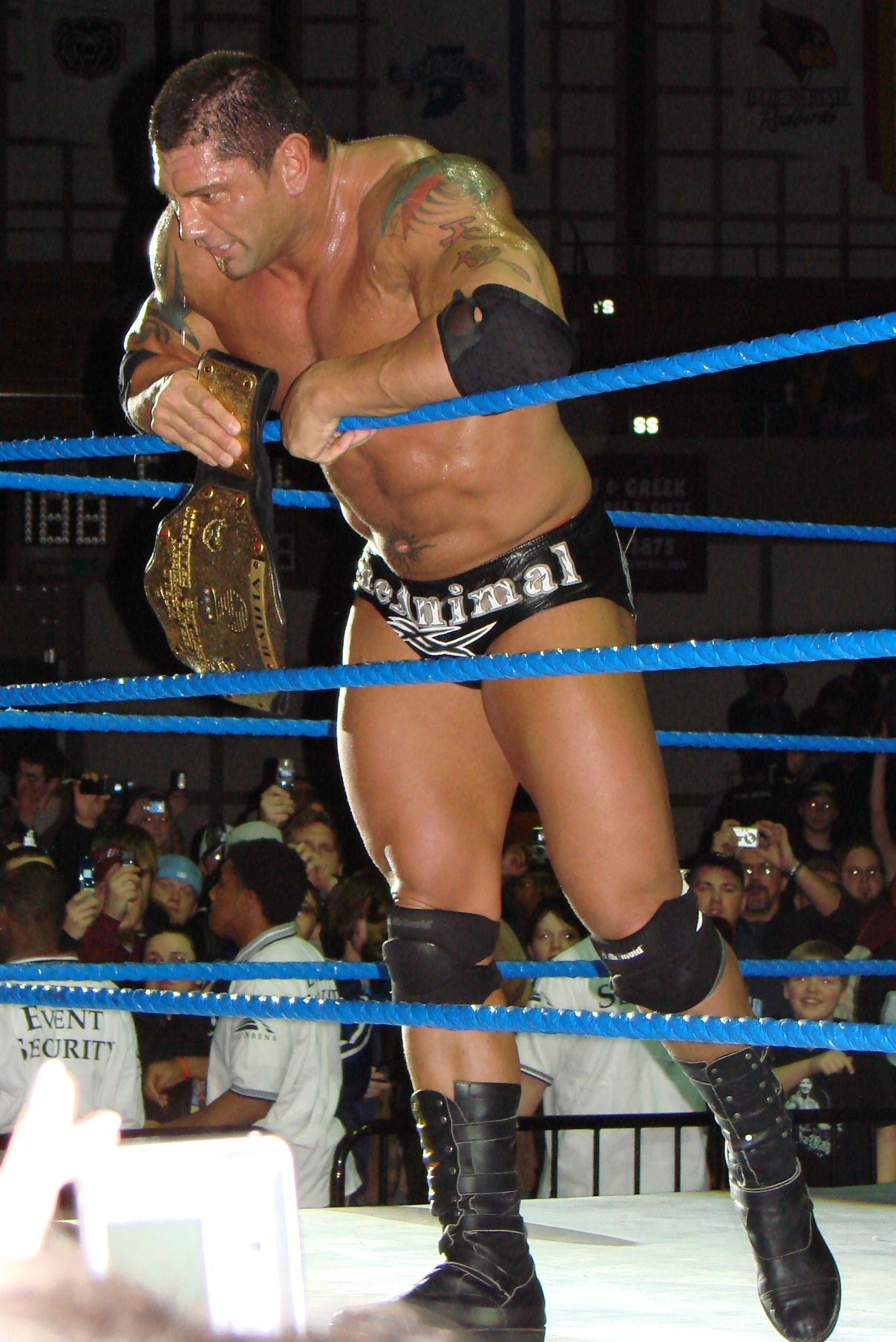
  Dave Batista, WWE World Heavyweight Championship
- Dixie Carter (wrestling) – President of Total Nonstop Action Wrestling
- Maria Kanellis – professional wrestler who has worked with WWE, TNA, and ROH. Former contestant on Celebrity Apprentice
- Jim Londos – champion wrestler during the 1930s-50s. Birth name Christos Theophilos.
- Helen Maroulis – freestyle wrestler
- George Metropoulos – Greco-Roman and freestyle wrestler
- Tom Packs – professional wrestling promoter - one of the top promoters over the first half of the 20th century
- Dawn Marie Psaltis (Dawn Marie) - former WWE wrestler
- Trish Stratus – WWE wrestler
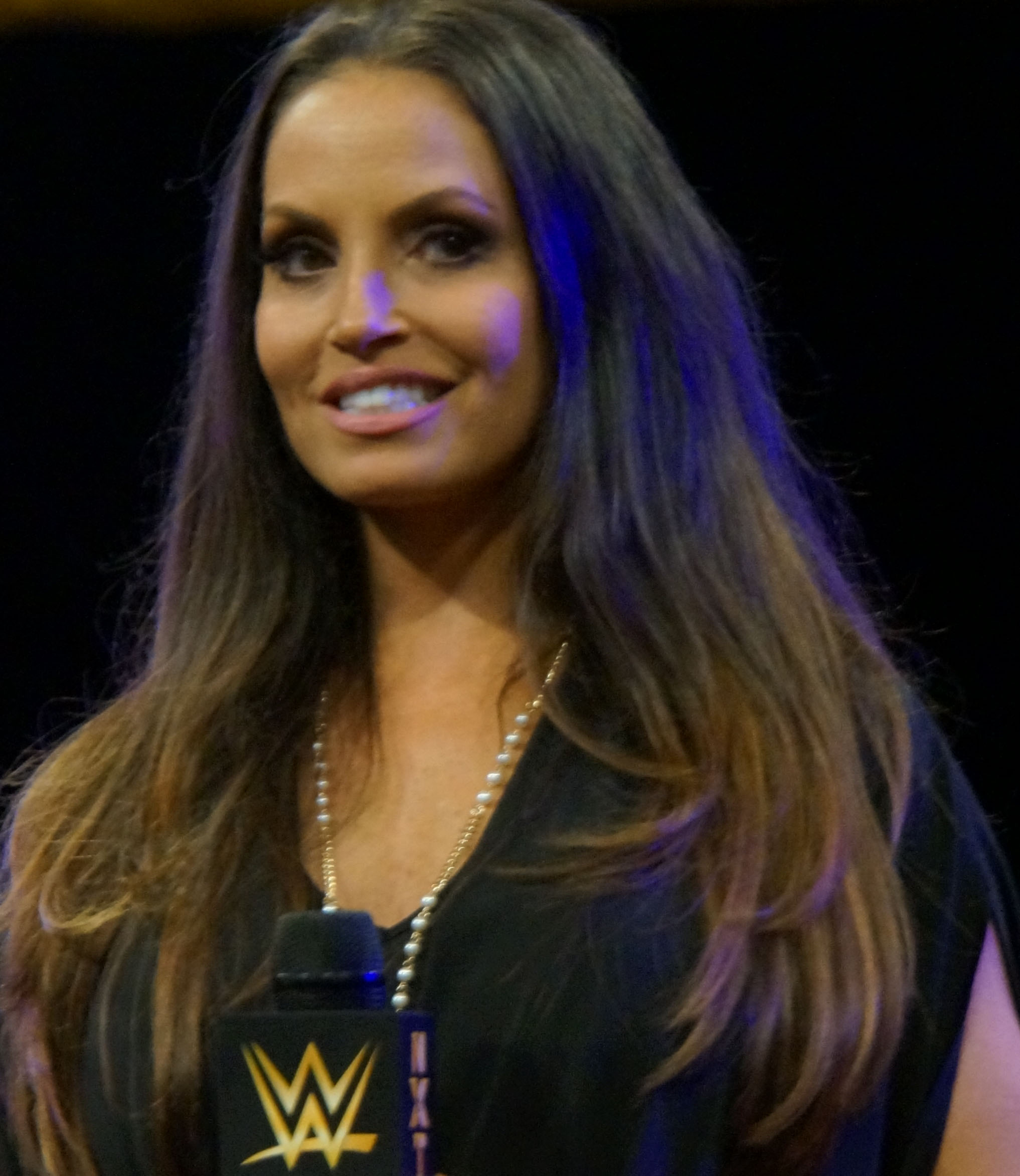
  Trish Stratus, WWE wrestler
- George Tragos – champion wrestler in Greece and trainer of American champion Lou Thesz. Co-founder of Wrestling Hall of Fame.
- George Zaharias – sports promoter and professional wrestler in the 1930s (birth name Theodore Vetoyanis). Husband of Babe Didrikson Zaharias.

=== Sports journalism ===
- Bob Costas – NBC sportscaster
- Spero Dedes – (born February 27, 1979) is an American sportscaster. He is currently employed by CBS Sports, calling the NFL, NBA, and college basketball. Previously worked play-by-play for the Los Angeles Lakers (radio) and New York Knicks (radio & TV).
- Jimmy Cefalo – sportscaster & former NFL wide receiver for Miami Dolphins.
- Mike Galanos – CNN/Sports Illustrated anchor
- Harry Kalas – sports announcer
- John Manuel – co-editor in chief, Baseball America magazine
- Rory Markas – sports announcer
- Petros Papadakis – former USC Trojans running back, sports talk show host
- Ted Sarandis – sports announcer
- Jimmy "the Greek" Snyder – James George Snyder Sr. (born Dimetrios Georgios Synodinos, September 9, 1918 – April 21, 1996), was an American sports commentator on CBS' The NFL Today from 1976 to 1988 and Las Vegas oddsmaker.

== Criminal figures ==
- Gus Alex (April 1, 1916 – July 24, 1998) - high-ranking associate of the Chicago Outfit
- Peter "Pete the Greek" Diapoulas - body guard of NYC mobster Joe Gallo, was present the night of Gallo's assassination.
- Fotios Geas – mobster involved with the Genovese crime family and murderer of Whitey Bulger in Hazelton (WV) Federal Penitentiary
- Tom Kapatos – New York City mobster, also known as "The Greek"
- Dr. George C. Nichopoulos – personal physician to Elvis Presley from 1970 to 1977 (Presley's death). Although exonerated in the death of Presley, Dr. Nichopoulos was later stripped of his medical license due to overprescribing medications to many other patients in the state of Tennessee.
- Michael Thevis - mobster
- Peter Kourakos "Pete The Greek" - founder of Greek-American organized crime in Astoria, Queens, New York.
- Spyredon "Spiros" Velentzas – Spiros Velentzas, aka "Sakafias", expanded the activities of the Kourakos crime family in New York City in the 1980s-1990s.

== See also ==
- Greeks
- Greek Cypriots
- Greek Americans
- Hellenism (disambiguation)
