= List of University of California, Santa Cruz people =

This page lists notable alumni and faculty of the University of California, Santa Cruz; alumni may have attended without graduating.

== Notable alumni ==
=== Academia ===
- William Drea Adams – president of Colby College, Waterville, Maine
- Michelle Anderson, B.A. 1989 – (born 1967) – president of Brooklyn College, and a scholar on rape law
- Stefano Bloch, B.A. 2001 – author, graffiti artist, and professor of cultural geography at the University of Arizona
- Hume A Feldman, BA 1984 – professor and chair, Department of Physics & Astronomy, University of Kansas, APS fellow
- Gabriel Filippelli, Ph.D, 1994 – biogeochemist and climate change researcher, IUPUI
- Yoav Freund, Ph.D. 1994 – professor of computer science at the University of California San Diego, winner of the Gödel Prize
- Kristen R. Ghodsee, B.A. 1993 – professor of Gender and Women's Studies at Bowdoin College; winner of 2012 Guggenheim Fellowship
- Alexander Gonzalez, Ph.D. 1979 – president of California State University, Sacramento
- Thyrza Nichols Goodeve – artist and writer, School of Visual Arts
- Victor Davis Hanson, B.A. 1975 – historian, professor emeritus of Classics at California State University, Fresno; Hoover Institution fellow; 2007 National Humanities Medal recipient
- Eva Simone Hayward – Women's Studies researcher on faculty at University of Arizona
- Andrew Jolivette; Ph.D. – professor of Ethnic Studies, senior specialist Native American and Indigenous Studies at University of California, San Diego
- Caren Kaplan, Ph.D. – professor of American Studies at UC Davis
- Steven G. Krantz, B.A – professor of Mathematics at Washington University in St. Louis; winner of the Chauvenet Prize
- Annette Lareau, B.A. 1974 – professor of Sociology at University of Pennsylvania
- Patricia Nelson Limerick – professor of History at University of Colorado and a leading historian of the American West
- Lisa Lowe, Ph.D. – professor of American Studies at Yale
- Tod Machover – MIT Media Lab
- Austin E. Quigley, Ph.D. – dean of Columbia College of Columbia University
- John R. Rickford, B.A. 1971 – professor of Linguistics at Stanford University and African American Vernacular English or Ebonics expert
- Sally Sedgwick, B.A. 1978 – Distinguished professor of Philosophy at University of Illinois at Chicago
- Jeffrey C. Stewart, B.A. 1971 – professor of Black Studies at University of California, Santa Barbara
- Bret Weinstein, B.A. – biologist and evolutionary theorist

=== Arts and letters ===
- Will Bagley, BA 1971 – historian of 1800s American West
- Michael A. Bellesiles, BA 1975 – author of Arming America: The origins of a National Gun Culture, which won the Bancroft Prize in 2001; the prize was rescinded by Columbia University in 2002 for having "violated basic norms of scholarship and the high standards expected of Bancroft Prize winners"
- Susie Bright – writer, sex activist and sex therapy focus leader
- Dean Byington, BA 1980 – visual artist
- Gail Carriger, MA 2008 – steampunk author
- C. Ondine Chavoya, BA 1992 – art historian of Latino/Chicano and queer art history, professor
- Maya Chinchilla, BA 2000 – Guatemalan-American poet
- Fred Cohen, BA 1980 – director of the School of Music & Dance, San Jose State University
- David Farley – BA 1995 – author of An Irreverent Curiosity, food and travel writer
- William Finnegan – BA 1974 – 2016 Pulitzer prize author of Barbarian Days, journalist
- Laurie Garrett, BA 1975 – Newsday science reporter and author, Pulitzer Prize winner
- Philip Kan Gotanda – playwright
- Reyna Grande, BA 1999 – author, American Book Award winner
- Kira Lynn Harris, MFA 1998 – artist
- bell hooks, PhD 1983 – author, educator, social critic
- Miranda July – filmmaker and writer
- Persis Karim, BA 1985 – poet, editor, educator, scholar of Iranian-Americans
- Lori Kay, BA 1986 – artist, sculptor
- Sahar Khoury, BA 1996 – sculptor
- Jayne Ann Krentz, BA 1970 – New York Times bestselling author
- Katerina Lanfranco, BA 2001 – artist
- Deborah Madison, BA 1968 – cookbook author, founding chef of the Greens Restaurant
- Steve Martini, BA 1968 – bestselling mysteries author
- Lou Mathews, BA 1973 – writer, "Best Book" of 1999 for L.A. Breakdown (L.A. Times)
- Jason Middlebrook, BFA 1990 – artist
- Samantha Mills – science fiction and fantasy writer; 2023 Hugo, Nebula, and Locus Best Short Story winner
- Omar Musa – Australian author, poet and rapper
- Kent Nagano, BA 1974 – conductor of the Los Angeles Opera and the Montreal Symphony Orchestra
- Catherine Newman, PhD – memoirist and novelist
- Jenny Parks – comics artist, fan artist, and scientific illustrator
- Johanna Poethig, BA 1980 – visual, public and performance artist
- Larry Polansky, BA – composer
- Dana Priest, BA 1981 – Washington Post reporter and author; winner of the 2006 Pulitzer Prize for Beat Reporting and 2008 Pulitzer Prize for Public Service
- Tanya Ragir, BA 1976 – artist
- Tlaloc Rivas, BA 1995 – theatre director, writer, and professor
- Joe Safdie, BA 1975 – poet
- Michael Schennum, BA 2000 – photojournalist
- Andrea Smith, PhD 2002 – Cherokee activist and author
- David Talbot, BA – founder of Salon.com, author, journalist
- Mark Teague, BA 1985 – author and illustrator of children's books
- Hector Tobar, BA – Los Angeles Times columnist, author, winner of Pulitzer Prize in 1992
- Bernt Wahl, BA 1984, BS 1986 – author and entrepreneur, Fulbright Fellow; coined UC Santa Cruz motto "Fiat Slug"
- Annie Wells, BA 1981 – photographer, filmmaker, winner of Pulitzer Prize for Spot News Photography in 1997
- Lawrence Weschler, 1974 – author
- Richard White – historian of American West, Native American history, and environmental history; MacArthur Foundation fellowship, 1995
- Daniel James Wolf, BA 1983 – composer
- Laurence Yep – author

=== Business ===
- Mike Cagney, BA/MS – co-founder and former CEO of SoFi
- Jonah Peretti, BS 1996 – founder of BuzzFeed and Huffington Post
- Sage Weil, PhD 2007 – founder of Ceph
- Susan Wojcicki, MS – former CEO of YouTube

=== Economics ===
- Andréa Maechler, PhD – Swiss economist; first woman on board of directors of the Swiss National Bank

=== Entertainment and broadcasting ===
- Anohni – attended in late 1980s, composer and singer for Anohni and the Johnsons, and visual artist
- Lorin Ashton, aka Bassnectar – free-form electronic music artist and DJ
- Juliet Bashore, BA English Literature/Film – filmmaker (Kamikaze Hearts, The Battle of Tuntenhaus)
- Matt Bettinelli-Olpin, BA – filmmaker (V/H/S, Southbound) and guitarist for Link 80
- Jello Biafra – singer and songwriter of the Dead Kennedys
- Brannon Braga – film writer for Star Trek Generations and an executive producer of 24
- Kauchani Bratt, BP 2023 – Coahuiltecan actor
- Bob Byington, BA 1988 – filmmaker (7 Chinese Brothers, Lousy Carter)
- Bill Carter, BA Politics, Economics – documentary film director and author
- Rick Carter, BA – Oscar-winning art director and production designer
- John Craigie, BA Mathematics 2002 – folk singer
- Dennis Delaney, BA Anthropology 1976 – writer and actor
- Brett Dennen – singer, songwriter
- Jacob Aaron Estes, BA 1994 – film screenwriter and director
- Anne Flett-Giordano, BA 1976 – television writer and producer (Kate & Allie, Frasier, Desperate Housewives)
- Stephanie Foo, BA 2008 – radio producer for This American Life
- Cary Joji Fukunaga, BA 1999 – filmmaker and showrunner (Sin Nombre, True Detective, Beasts of No Nation)
- Matthew Gray Gubler, BA – actor (Criminal Minds) and director
- Richard Gunn, BA 1997 – actor (Dark Angel, Granite Flats, and For the Love of Money)
- Richard Harris – National Public Radio science reporter
- Alice Inoue – former television presenter and author
- Ethan Klein, BA English Literature 2009 – YouTube video blogger and satirist known for h3h3Productions
- Elissa Knight, BA Theater & English Literature 1997 – voice actress
- Victor Krummenacher – bassist for Camper Van Beethoven, Monks of Doom
- Gretchen Lieberum – singer, songwriter
- David Lowery, BA 1984 – singer and songwriter for Camper Van Beethoven and Cracker
- Camryn Manheim, BA 1984 – actress
- Barry Mendel – film producer (Rushmore, Sixth Sense, Munich, Funny People)
- Stephen Mirrione, BA – Academy Award-winning film editor
- Dacoury Natche, aka DJ Dahi – Grammy-nominated hip-hop producer
- Bradley Nowell – singer and songwriter with Sublime
- Marti Noxon, BA – TV producer
- Joe Palca, PhD 1982 – National Public Radio science reporter
- Jack Passion, BA 2006 – competitive beard grower and star of IFC's Whisker Wars
- Rebecca Romijn – supermodel, actress
- Maya Rudolph, BA 1995 – actress, former Saturday Night Live cast member
- Andy Samberg, BA – actor, former Saturday Night Live cast member, co-founder of comedy trio The Lonely Island
- Tim Schafer – game designer for LucasArts and founder of Double Fine Productions
- Akiva Schaffer, BA – actor, filmmaker, former Saturday Night Live writer, co-founder of comedy trio The Lonely Island
- Amber Sealey, BA – film director and actress
- Jonathan Segel, BA 1985 – composer, multi-instrumentalist for Camper Van Beethoven
- Nikki Silva, BA 1973 – one half of The Kitchen Sisters, who are regularly featured on NPR
- Julie Snyder, BA 1995 – producer of NPR's Serial and S-Town
- SRSQ – musician
- Broke-Ass Stuart, BA 2003 – travel writer, poet, host of IFC's Young Broke & Beautiful
- Chris Tashima – actor, Academy Award-winning filmmaker
- Jesse Thorn, BS – host of NPR's Bullseye with Jesse Thorn and co-host of Jordan, Jesse, Go!
- Omi Vaidya – American actor in Bollywood films, known for role in 3 Idiots
- Rubén Valtierra, BA – keyboardist for "Weird Al" Yankovic
- Ally Walker, BS – actress known for roles in Profiler, Sons of Anarchy, and The Protector
- Gillian Welch, BA 1990 – singer and songwriter
- Rich Wilkes, BA 1988 – writer, filmmaker (Billy Madison, Stoned Age, Beer Money, XXX, Airheads)
- Still Woozy, BA 2014 – musician, songwriter

=== Law ===
- Nate Cardozo, BA 2003 – privacy and civil rights attorney, currently managing privacy at WhatsApp
- Vince Girdhari Chhabria, BA 1991 – judge, United States District Court for the Northern District of California
- Joan E. Donoghue, BA 1978 – judge, International Court of Justice
- Ricardo García, BA 1991 – public defender for Los Angeles County
- Rachel Goslins, BA 1991 – copyright attorney, director of the Smithsonian's Arts and Industries Museum, former executive director of the President's Committee on the Arts and Humanities
- Charles Harder, BA 1991 – entertainment and civil lawyer known for representing President Donald Trump, Melania Trump, and many other celebrities

=== Politics and public life ===
- Bettina Aptheker, PhD – leader in the Berkeley Free Speech Movement
- Katherine Canavan, BA – former United States ambassador to Botswana and United States ambassador to Lesotho
- Rebecca Cokley, BA – former director of the Disability Justice Initiative at the Center for American Progress (CAP)
- John Doolittle, BA 1972 – member, U.S. House of Representatives, California's 4th Congressional District
- Eli Erlick, PhD – writer, transgender activist, founder of Trans Student Educational Resources
- Ron Gonzales, BA – mayor of San Jose, California, 1999–2006
- Victor Davis Hanson, BA 1975 – senior fellow at the Hoover Institution
- James Charles Kopp, BA Biology 1976 – murderer of Buffalo abortion doctor Barnett Slepian in 1998; convicted in 2003 and serving sentence of 25 years to life
- John Laird, BA 1972 – California Natural Resources Agency Secretary, former California assemblyman, and mayor of Santa Cruz
- Don Lane – former mayor of Santa Cruz, California
- Jamus Lim, MA 2006, PhD 2006 – member of the 14th Parliament of Singapore, member of the opposition Workers' Party of Singapore and associate professor at ESSEC Business School
- Nina Milliken, BA 2010, Maine state representative
- Azadeh Moaveni, BA – journalist and writer
- Huey P. Newton, BA 1974, PhD 1980 – co-founding member of the Black Panther Party
- Aaron Peskin – San Francisco Board of Supervisors member
- Claire Pierangelo, BA 1982 – current US ambassador to the Republic of Madagascar and Union of Comoros
- Drummond Pike, BA 1970 – Tides Foundation founder, philanthropist, and social entrepreneur
- Art Torres, BA 1968 – California Democratic Party chairman, former California state senator
- Randy Villegas, PhD – U.S. Representative-elect for California's 22nd congressional district

=== Science ===
- Richard Bandler, MA 1975 – co-creator of neuro-linguistic programming
- Joseph DeRisi, BA 1992 – molecular biologist, professor at UC San Francisco, MacArthur Fellow, known for work on SARS and malaria
- Alan Dressler, PhD 1976 – staff astronomer at the Carnegie Institution for Science, member of the National Academy of Sciences, cosmologist, author
- J. Doyne Farmer, PhD 1981 – pioneer in chaos theory, Prediction Company, Santa Fe Institute
- Judy Fierstein, multiple – geologist
- Debra Fischer, PhD 1998 – professor of Astronomy at Yale University, planet finder
- Yoav Freund, PhD 1993 – computer scientist, professor at University of California, San Diego, inventor of AdaBoost
- John Grinder, PhD 1971 – linguist, co-creator of neuro-linguistic programming
- Howard Hang, BS 1998 – professor of Chemistry at Rockefeller University
- Steven Hawley, PhD 1977 – astronaut, professor of Physics at the University of Kansas
- Holly Jones, BS – restoration ecologist and conservation biologist, associate professor at Northern Illinois University
- Stacy Jupiter, PhD 2003 – director of the Melanesia Program for the Wildlife Conservation Society, MacArthur Fellows Program
- Lara Mahal, BA 1996 – professor of Chemistry at New York University
- Geoffrey Marcy, PhD 1982 – professor of Astronomy at UC Berkeley, planet finder, and member of the National Academy of Sciences
- Teenie Matlock, PhD, 2001 – professor emerita of Cognitive Science at University of California, Merced
- Marc Okrand, BA 1972 – linguist, creator of the Klingon language
- Julie Packard, BA 1974, MA 1978 – founder and executive director of the Monterey Bay Aquarium
- Mark M. Phillips, PhD 1978 – staff astronomer at Las Campanas Observatory, inventor of the Phillips relationship, pioneer in supernova cosmology
- Rob Shaw, PhD 1980 – MacArthur Award for work on chaos theory, 1988
- Pamela Silver, BA 1974 – professor of Systems Biology at Harvard Medical School, first Director of Harvard University Systems Biology Graduate Program, synthetic biologist
- Deborah Steinberg, PhD 1973 – biological oceanographer, Antarctic researcher
- Kathryn D. Sullivan, BS 1973 – astronaut, science museum CEO (COSI Columbus), Under Secretary of Commerce for Oceans and Atmosphere, NOAA Administrator
- Nicholas B. Suntzeff, PhD 1980 – professor of Astronomy at Texas A&M University; cosmologist; co-founder of High-Z Supernova Search Team, which discovered dark energy
- Bill Woodcock, BA 1993 – best known for his 1989 origination of the anycast routing technique that is now ubiquitous in Internet content distribution networks and the domain name system

=== Sports ===
- Anton Peterlin – soccer player

== Notable faculty ==
- Martin Abadi – professor emeritus, Computer Science and Engineering; known for Burrows–Abadi–Needham logic and Baby Modula-3
- Ralph Abraham – professor emeritus of mathematics, notable for founding the Visual Mathematics Institute and for his pioneering work on chaos theory
- Bettina Aptheker – professor of feminist studies and history
- Elliot Aronson – professor emeritus of psychology; author of The Social Animal and Nobody Left to Hate: Teaching Compassion after Columbine; creator of the jigsaw classroom model; one of the few psychologists to win the American Psychological Association's highest honor in all three fields
- John Backus – late adjunct professor of Computer Science; won Turing Award for creating Fortran
- Reyner Banham – late professor of art history and a preeminent architectural historian, in particular of the modern era
- Tom Banks – professor of physics; known for work on string theory, elementary particle physics, and cosmology
- Gregory Bateson – late lecturer and fellow of Kresge College; anthropologist, social scientist, linguist, visual anthropologist, semiotician and cyberneticist
- George R. Blumenthal – professor of astronomy and astrophysics, and chancellor of the University of California, Santa Cruz
- Norman O. Brown – late professor emeritus of humanities
- William L. Burke – late professor of physics (cosmologist); chaos theory "godfather"
- James H. Clark – assistant professor of information science, founder of Silicon Graphics and Netscape
- James Clifford – professor of history of consciousness, known for publications of postmodernist and postcolonial interpretations of anthropology and ethnography
- David Cope – professor of music; notable for his experiments in A.I. and computer-created musical compositions
- Angela Davis – professor of history of consciousness, writer, activist
- Nathaniel Deutsch – professor and Baumgarten Endowed Chair in Jewish Studies
- John Dizikes – professor emeritus of American studies, author, won the 1993 National Book Critics Circle Award
- Frank Drake – professor emeritus of astronomy and astrophysics; proposed the Drake Equation; member of the AAAS (elected 1974)
- William Everson – late lecturer and poet-in-residence
- Sandra M. Faber – professor of astronomy and astrophysics; instrumental in inventing cold dark matter theory and fundamental work in the field of galaxy formation and evolution; member of the NAS (elected 1985), the AAAS (elected 1989), and the American Philosophical Society (elected 2001)
- Alison Galloway – forensic anthropologist who worked in identifying the physical remains of Laci Peterson in the trial of Scott Peterson
- Shelly Grabe – associate professor of social psychology and scholar-activist in women's human rights
- Craig Haney – professor of psychology and instrumental researcher in the Stanford Prison Experiment
- Donna Haraway – professor of history of consciousness; doctorate in biology; often-cited author of feminist history of science and culture studies of cyborgs
- David Haussler – professor of biomolecular engineering; he and his team assembled the public draft human genome and developed the Genome Browser as part of the Human Genome Project; member of the AAAS (elected 2006) and the National Academy of Sciences
- George Herbig – emeritus professor of astronomy and astrophysics, pioneer in the study of star formation, discoverer of the Herbig Ae/Be stars and Herbig-Haro Objects, member of the National Academy of Sciences
- George Hitchcock – late lecturer, poetry and theater
- Albert Hofstadter – deceased; professor of philosophy
- David A. Huffman – deceased; founding faculty of the Information and Computer Science Board; developed Huffman coding
- Harry Huskey – deceased; professor of Computer Science; advised many countries on how to establish an academic Computer Science program
- Frederic Jameson – professor of history of consciousness; cultural critic and theorist of the post-modern; published the essay "Postmodernism, or, the Cultural Logic of Late Capitalism", a significant investigation into contemporary culture and the political economy
- Jim Kent – associate research scientist in the Department of Biomolecular Engineering; directs the genome browser development and quality assurance staff of the UCSC Genome Bioinformatics Group; created the computer program that assembled the first working draft of the human genome sequence; participates in the public consortium efforts to produce, assemble, and annotate genomes
- Robert P. Kraft – professor of astronomy and astrophysics, stellar astronomer, member of the National Academy of Sciences
- Cynthia Ling Lee – professor of theatre arts, known for postmodern and classical Indian dance
- Tom Lehrer – lecturer in American studies and mathematics; known for his satire and songwriting
- Darrell Long – professor of computer science and engineering, fellow of the Institute of Electrical and Electronics Engineers (IEEE) and the American Association for the Advancement of Science (AAAS)
- Chip Lord – professor of film and digital media; member of Ant Farm, a groundbreaking, experimental art and architecture collective he founded in 1968 with fellow architect Doug Michels
- Nathaniel Mackey – poet and editor
- Dominic W. Massaro – professor of psychology and computer engineering; originator of the fuzzy logical model of perception, one of the leading theories of speech perception
- Claire Ellen Max – professor of astronomy and astrophysics, member of the AAAS (elected 2002) and the National Academy of Sciences
- Gordon Mumma – professor emeritus of music, composer
- Richard Abel Musgrave – member of the American Academy of Arts and Sciences (elected 1961)
- Maurice Natanson – deceased; professor of philosophy
- Jerry Nelson – professor of astronomy and astrophysics; pioneered the use of mirror segments, making the Keck telescopes possible; member of the NAS
- Harry Noller – professor of biology; RNA research; member of the American Academy of Arts and Sciences (elected 1969) and the National Academy of Sciences (elected 1992)
- Donald E. Osterbrock – member of the American Academy of Arts and Sciences (elected 1968) and the National Academy of Sciences (elected 1966)
- Micah Perks – fiction writer and memoirist
- Larry Polansky – professor of music, composer and performing artist
- Ann Hunter Popkin – women's rights activist
- Joel Primack – professor of physics, noted cosmologist; renowned for cold dark matter theory proposed along with Sandra Faber (see above) and Sir Martin Rees
- Geoffrey Pullum – professor of linguistics and distinguished professor of humanities; co-author of Cambridge Grammar of the English Language; member of the American Academy of Arts and Sciences (elected 2003)
- Adrienne Rich – late professor, poet and essayist
- Constance M. Rockosi – chair of the astronomy and astrophysics department
- Kate R. Rosenbloom – tech project manager, Center for Biomolecular Science and Engineering, member of ENCODE
- Beth Shapiro – professor of ecology and evolutionary biology; author of How to Clone a Mammoth
- Bakthan Singaram – professor of organic chemistry and former researcher
- Page Smith – historian
- Michael Ellman Soule – member of the American Academy of Arts and Sciences (elected 2005)
- Ben Stein – former professor of economics, more notable for his work as a comedian, actor and political commentator
- Stephen Thorsett – professor of astronomy and astrophysics; dean of physical and biological science; known for work on properties of compact stars
- Anna Tsing – professor of anthropology; Guggenheim Fellow and Niels Bohr Professorship
- Noah Wardrip-Fruin – associate professor of computer science, digital media and interactive fiction researcher
- Manfred K. Warmuth – professor of Computer Science, known for weighted majority algorithm
- Hayden White – member of the American Academy of Arts and Sciences (elected 1991)
- Jim Whitehead – chair of Computer Science and creator of WebDAV
- Harold Widom – member of the American Academy of Arts and Sciences (elected 2006)
- Terrie Williams – professor of ecology and evolutionary biology
- Gurdon Woods – sculptor, founding chair of the art department at UC Santa Cruz, 1966–1974
- Stanford E. Woosley – professor of astronomy and astrophysics; noted for his work on supernova gamma ray bursts; member of the NAS (elected 2006) and American Academy of Arts and Sciences (elected 2001)
- Karen Tei Yamashita – author and playwright, recipient of the National Book Award's Medal for Distinguished Contribution to American Letters in 2021
