= Filippelli =

Filippelli is an Italian surname. Notable people with the name include:

- Filippo di Antonio Filippelli (1460–1506), Italian Renaissance painter
- Gabriel Filippelli, American biogeochemist and professor of Earth sciences
- Gérard Filippelli (1942 – 2021), French actor, composer, and singer
- Rafael Filippelli (1938 – 2023), Argentine film director
- Riccardo Filippelli (1980), Italian sport shooter
- John J. Filippelli (1951), American sports television executive and producer

== See also ==
- Filippi
