= The Seller =

- 1998 Release Poster
- Directed by: Craig Schlattman
- Written by: Craig Schlattman
- Produced by: Stephen John Stofflet; Marcus Burton; Juliet Bashore
- Starring: Brian Brophy; Kathy Morozova; Arthur Roberts; Adam Paul; Mink Stole
- Cinematography: Bubba Bukowski; Wes Llewellyn
- Edited by: Lester Fatt; Victor Livingston
- Release date: 1998
- Running time: 117 minutes
- Country: United States
- Language: English

The Seller is a 1998 American Independent feature film written and directed by American director Craig Schlattman. It stars Brian Brophy, Mink Stole, Arthur Roberts, and Kathy Morozova in her first film role.

== Plot ==
Bart (Brian Brophy), a used car salesman in the midst of realizing his life is a failure, kills the obnoxious parents of what he believes is an abused 12-year-old brat, Melissa (Kathy Morozova), as he tries to close them in the sale of the only car he has left on his lot. Despite witnessing this, Melissa refuses to shoot him when he hands her the gun and tells her he would “understand”, then promises to take her cross-country to Texas to live with her only surviving family, Aunt Betty (Mink Stole), in what he believes will be a final act of salvation - one last good deed. With his two salesmen, Dwight (Adam Paul) and Derrick (Arthur Roberts) in tow, they take flight from the murders and one Quinton Bendick (Andre Marquis), Bart's sadistic mentor, former friend and creditor, and become an odd family with Derrick serving as a father figure for Bart and Dwight, while Bart becomes father and friend to this tough, intelligent 12-year-old.

At a river bed Bart dances a 70's line dance with Melissa in front of the car that contains the bodies of her parents, just before he dumps it into a river. In an accident of fate, the group discovers Melissa's prowess with a gun, and Bart teaches her about life, wearing the white hat, doing the right thing, and Annie Oakley, whom she comes to idolize.

Bart and Melissa team up to do a trade to a small town used car salesman (David Alexander) as Melissa comes to Bart's aid for the first time. A small town bartender matches bravado with Derrick with disastrous results for Dwight when he hits him in the head with a beer mug, wounding him severely.

Stopping in a lounge Bart dances with Melissa again, and as she begins to feel her youth and freedom we watch her through Bart's not so parental eyes. In a seedy small-town motel it becomes apparent Dwight's head wound is too severe to ignore, and Derrick and Dwight leave the group to take Dwight to a hospital.

On a dry lakebed we witness the bonding, friendship, and tragedy of Bart and Melissa's haunting relationship before it builds to a final climax at Aunt Betty's house as Quinton shows up and the terror, beauty, and banality of their journey come to a head. Quinton humiliates and degrades Bart in front of Melissa, and Bart's compliance with and embrace of his humiliation motivates Melissa to a surprising, violent, and bittersweet action. The first adult decision of this 12-year-old ensues; a wrenching decision full of the mixed emotions of both characters, and fantasy of what could have been, and what ultimately could never be.

== Cast ==
- Brian Brophy as Bartholomew Trust
- Kathy Morozova as Melissa
- Arthur Roberts as Derrick
- Adam Paul as Dwight
- Mink Stole as Aunt Betty
- Nancy Van Iderstine as Carla

== Production ==
The Seller's tense opening tone was created in a small warehouse location in Los Angeles, then continued to the surrounding areas via rental truck and hard-working crew. This intimate team went on location to Frazier Park and continued to skirt the city in the desert area around El Mirage, Victorville and Lancaster. An August shoot made the desert locations beautiful in their peculiar resilience to the elements and the filmmakers, but also incredibly hot.

The company went on the road for a two-week trip, sharing motel rooms and shooting in pre-arranged and improvised locations, then basing themselves in Victorville, where cast and crew members came and left as shooting demanded, or went on to previous commitments. All the small town locations were shot in Victorville or Frazier Park, making use of the feel and sparse tone of the areas, but also making viewing dailies impossible, meaning the production was shooting blind. The four dedicated leads spent the full two weeks shooting in the area with the director, and quietly put up with the relative discomfort of being away from home and shooting in an open car, in August, in the desert. With clinging clothes disappearing between takes, passers-by may have thought it was some strange desert beach movie. The motel pool was put to a thorough use in the evenings just to keep cool.

Arriving back in the Valley for Aunt Betty's location was bittersweet in its loss of small-town friendliness and driving, but welcome in its more temperate climate. Aunt Betty's Reseda location took place over four days and fit perfectly into the suburban small-town Texas feel needed for the culminating scenes. Shooting as sequentially as possible was a conscious decision designed to give the actors the kind of emotional fuel needed to drive a dénouement full of the complicated emotional and psychological range needed in Aunt Betty's tacky Texas living room.

== Reception ==
The Seller opened in Chicago to extremely positive reviews, like;

“An astonishing fusion of stark landscape cinematography and wildly compelling close-ups, especially of Brophy as he delivers hypnotic monologues that seem to be about everything and nothing at once and that lay bare his character's internal processes without demystifying them. Schlattman has rarefied emotion instead of breaking it down – his characters are indelible because they retain their mystery even as they let you inside.”
Lisa Alspector – Chicago Reader

“The festival’s most gratifying find could be The Seller which deserves a much larger audience. The meandering discussions they have about life, death, dreams and mortality have all the sizzle and wit you could ever hope to find in a movie. One of my favorite films of the year.”
John Patrakis – Chicago Tribune

“A stunning film.”
KPFK – Los Angeles

“The festival's best bet... Schlattman's precise vision recalls auteur Jon Jost, America's ace seer of Western wastelands.”
Bill Stamets – Chicago Sun Times

However, the film was given a very poor distribution by a minor distributor and failed to get to “a much larger audience.”
