= Don Lane (disambiguation) =

Don Lane (1933–2009) was a talk show host and singer.

Don Lane may also refer to:

- Don Lane (politician) (1935–1995), Australian politician
- Don Lane (Santa Cruz) (born 1956), mayor of Santa Cruz, California
- Donald Edward Lane (1909–1979), judge
