= Eric Zentner =

American fashion model

- Born: Eric Burnell Zentner; 20 February 1981; Winters, California, United States
- Died: 26 March 2011 (aged 30); Buellton, California, United States
- Occupation: Fashion model
- Modeling information
- Height: 6 ft 1 in (185 cm)

Eric Burnell Zentner (February 20, 1981 – March 26, 2011) was an American male fashion model active primarily in the 2000s. He was known for his appearances in ad campaigns for fashion brands such as Versace and Louis Vuitton, and also in Katy Perry's music video for "Hot n Cold".

== Career ==
Zentner was born in Winters, California. He began professional modeling at the age of 19. According to an interview he'd given to the Punk Globe magazine, he was discovered while walking into a Red Robin restaurant when he was 19.

He worked with the likes of Versace, H&M and Macy's as well as walked in shows for Marc Jacobs, Louis Vuitton and Gucci. He was best known for his work with Versace, Louis Vuitton, Marc Jacobs, and for a cameo appearance in Katy Perry's "Hot N Cold" music video.

He also appeared in ad campaigns for Nike and K-Swiss in his later years.

== Death ==
On March 26, 2011, Zentner, reportedly en route to visit his mother in Sacramento, was killed in a hit-and-run accident in Buellton, California. He was 30.

== See also ==
- List of people who died in road accidents

== External ==
- Eric Zentner at IMDb
- "Eric Zentner" ModelMayhem
- "ERIC ZENTNER" Punk Globe
