= Saturn Cafe =

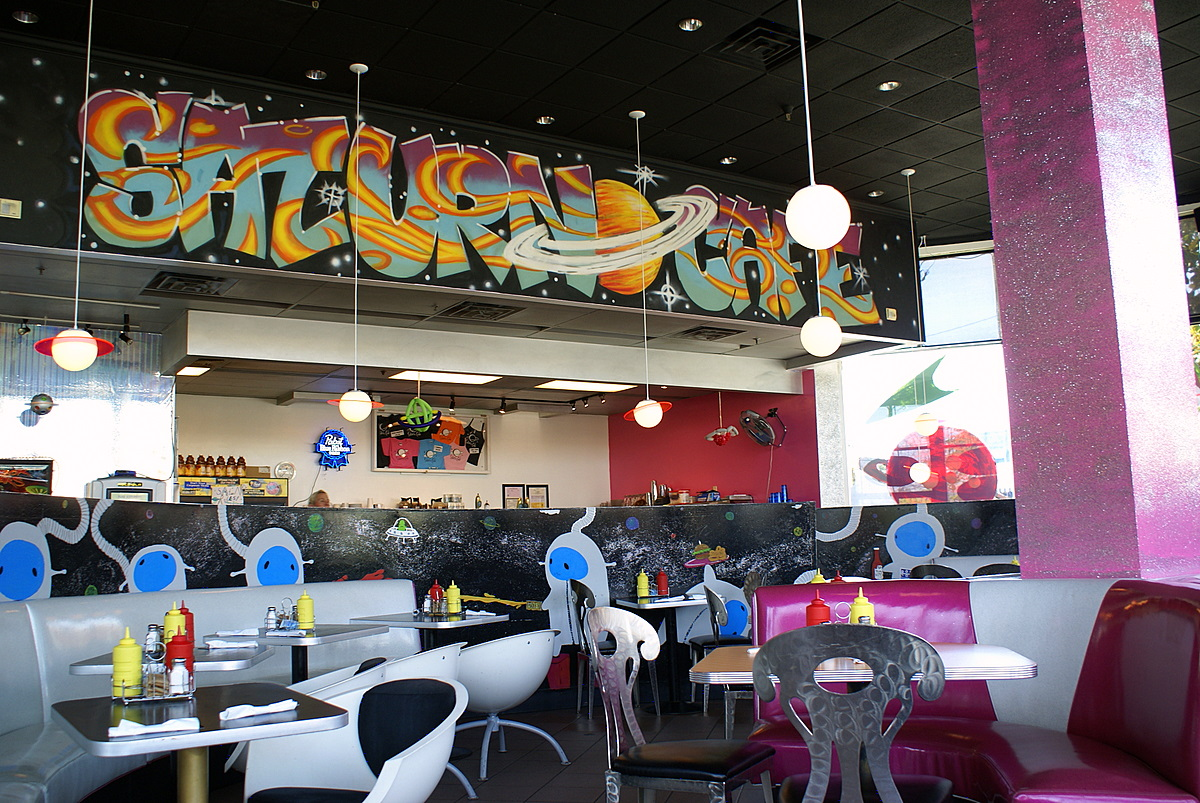
- The former Saturn Cafe in Santa Cruz, California

Restaurant information
- Established: 1979 (Santa Cruz); 2010 (Berkeley); 2020 (Los Angeles); 2022 (Oakland)
- Closed: 2019 (Berkeley); 2021 (Santa Cruz); 2022 (Los Angeles); 2022 (Oakland)
- Previous owner: Don Lane
- Location: California, United States
- Website: saturncafe.com

The Saturn Cafe was a vegetarian diner founded in Santa Cruz, California, with former locations in Berkeley, Los Angeles, and Oakland. Its original Santa Cruz location was established in the Westside neighborhood in 1979, moved to a new downtown location in 1999, and closed in 2021; the Los Angeles restaurant opened in 2020 and closed in 2022. The Santa Cruz location has been variously owned by Don Lane, a husband and wife team, and former employees of the diner. The Berkeley location of Saturn Cafe was open from 2009 to 2018. The Oakland location was shortlived, opening and closing in 2022.

The Saturn offered an entirely vegetarian menu, as well as vegan, gluten-free, and soy-free options. Its vegetarian take on classic American diner food also featured local and organic ingredients. It has been critically acclaimed by numerous publications for its large menu, variety of vegan interpretations of dishes, and appeal to customers who regularly eat meat. The Saturn was known for its progressivism, especially its commitments to environmental and social justice.

== History ==
The Saturn Cafe was established in Santa Cruz, California in 1979. It was founded by City Council candidate and future Mayor of Santa Cruz Don Lane on Mission Street. It moved to a larger building across the street in 1982, and in 1984 Lane was joined by the husband and wife team of Cary and Melissa Sunberg as co-owners, by which time it had developed a reputation for value. In 1988, while under Lane's ownership, the Saturn Cafe was damaged by a fire deemed suspicious by local authorities.

In May 1993, two of the Saturn Cafe's workers tested positive for hepatitis A; although no one was positively infected at the restaurant, a public health notice caused a noticeable drop in business while over 550 customers obtained virus inoculations and a public gathering of local artists, politicians, and others at the restaurant was organized to support the Saturn. In March 1994, the Saturn Cafe celebrated its 15th anniversary, by which point Lane estimated that it had served over one million customers and made over 500 donations to local organizations. In May 1995, the Saturn's employees picketed the restaurant and voted 13–6 to unionize, joining Local 415 of Service Employees International Union. In December 1995, co-owners Cary and Melissa Sunberg sold the restaurant to employees Sarah Smith, Annie Schuessler and Tristan Nathe.

In February 1996, former employees Sarah Smith, Annie Schuessler, and Tristan Nathe re-opened the Saturn Cafe with a unionized kitchen, newly simplified interior design, and table service, which the former incarnation of the restaurant did not feature. On January 1, 1999, the Saturn was damaged by a fire that caused approximately $50,000 in damage and forced the restaurant to close for a month. In February 1999, the owners of the Saturn Cafe signed a lease for a location on Pacific Avenue with 3,600 square feet (330 m^{2}) of space that was formerly occupied by a Boston Market location. After delays in March caused by issues with insurance coverage between the Saturn and Cal-Farm Insurance Company, co-owners Tristan Nathe and Abigail Andromacha finally opened the restaurant's new location as a retro-themed 24-hour diner on Pacific Avenue in September 1999.

In March 2001, the Saturn Cafe ended its 24-hour service due to increasing electricity and employee costs, although it remained open until 2:30 am on weekdays and 3:30 am on weekends. In 2003, the Saturn, which already had established a strong anti-war stance, relabeled its French fries as "Impeach Bush Fries" in response to the United States House of Representatives cafeteria's decision to rename its fries as "Freedom fries".

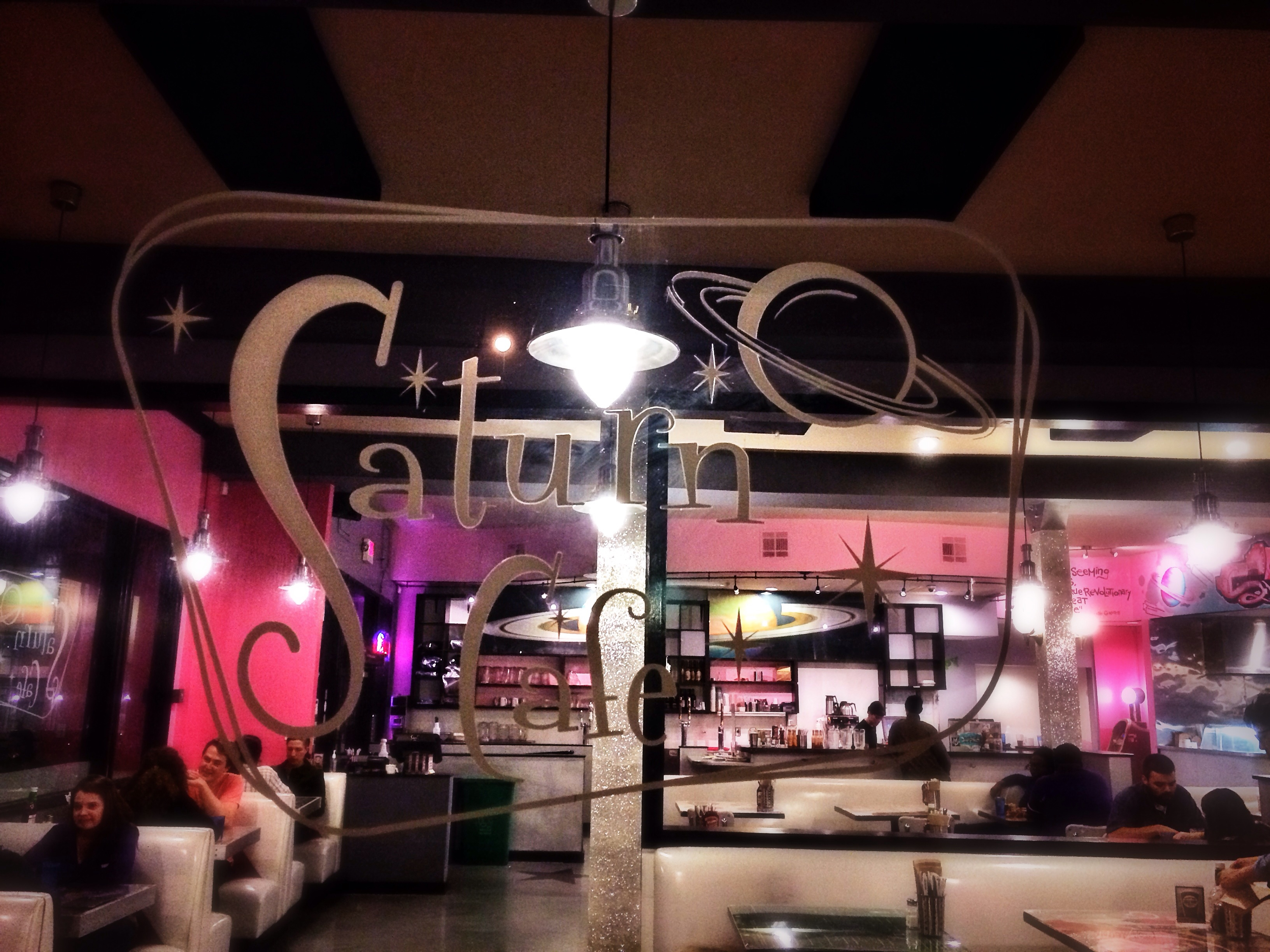
The Saturn Cafe in Berkeley, California

In addition to its Santa Cruz location, the Saturn Cafe expanded to Berkeley, California; the Berkeley location, just west of the UC Berkeley campus, was opened in 2009. In 2017, as the City of Berkeley considered banning plastic drinking straws for environmental reasons (they contribute to pollution of San Francisco Bay and the Earth's oceans), the Saturn began using thick paper straws that are biodegradable. The Berkeley location closed in July 2019 due to staffing shortages. The Saturn Cafe opened a location in Northeast Los Angeles in 2020, which closed in 2021.

The owners of the Saturn Cafe announced in April 2021 that the Santa Cruz location would not be reopening as a result of the COVID-19 pandemic. In February 2022, the Saturn Cafe returned to the Bay Area with a new location in Oakland. Located at Longfellow Food Hall at 5325 Adeline Street, it offers both delivery and take-out options. The Oakland restaurant closed sometime in late 2022

== Identity ==
Both Saturn Cafe locations are Space Age-styled diners with a pink, retro atmosphere. The Santa Cruz location is in a round building featuring red vinyl banquettes and display-box Formica tables. The Berkeley location was noted for its dog-friendly patio. The Saturn Cafe bills itself as providing "vegetarian and vegan comfort food". Its menu is entirely vegetarian, although it also offers vegan, gluten-free, and soy-free food. Featuring local as well as organic ingredients, it offers a vegetarian take on classic American diner food. Sarah Han of Berkeleyside describes its menu as consisting of "comforting all-American and all-vegetarian fare".

The Saturn Cafe is also known for its progressivism, both in its business operations and its willingness to take political stands, especially regarding its commitments to environmental and social justice. In the words of Leah Moldowan of Go Dairy Free, its owners "value healthy living, sustainability, diversity, and community". During the Cinco de Mayo weekend in 2017, the Saturn was one of numerous Berkeley restaurants to offer discounted, resistance-themed menu items in support of undocumented residents.

The Saturn Cafe serves brunch all day, and also has a late-night menu; the Santa Cruz location was open until 3 am in 2005, although as of 2019 it is open until midnight. VegNews named it one of the "8 Best Vegan Brunch Spots in the Bay Area".

== Menu ==
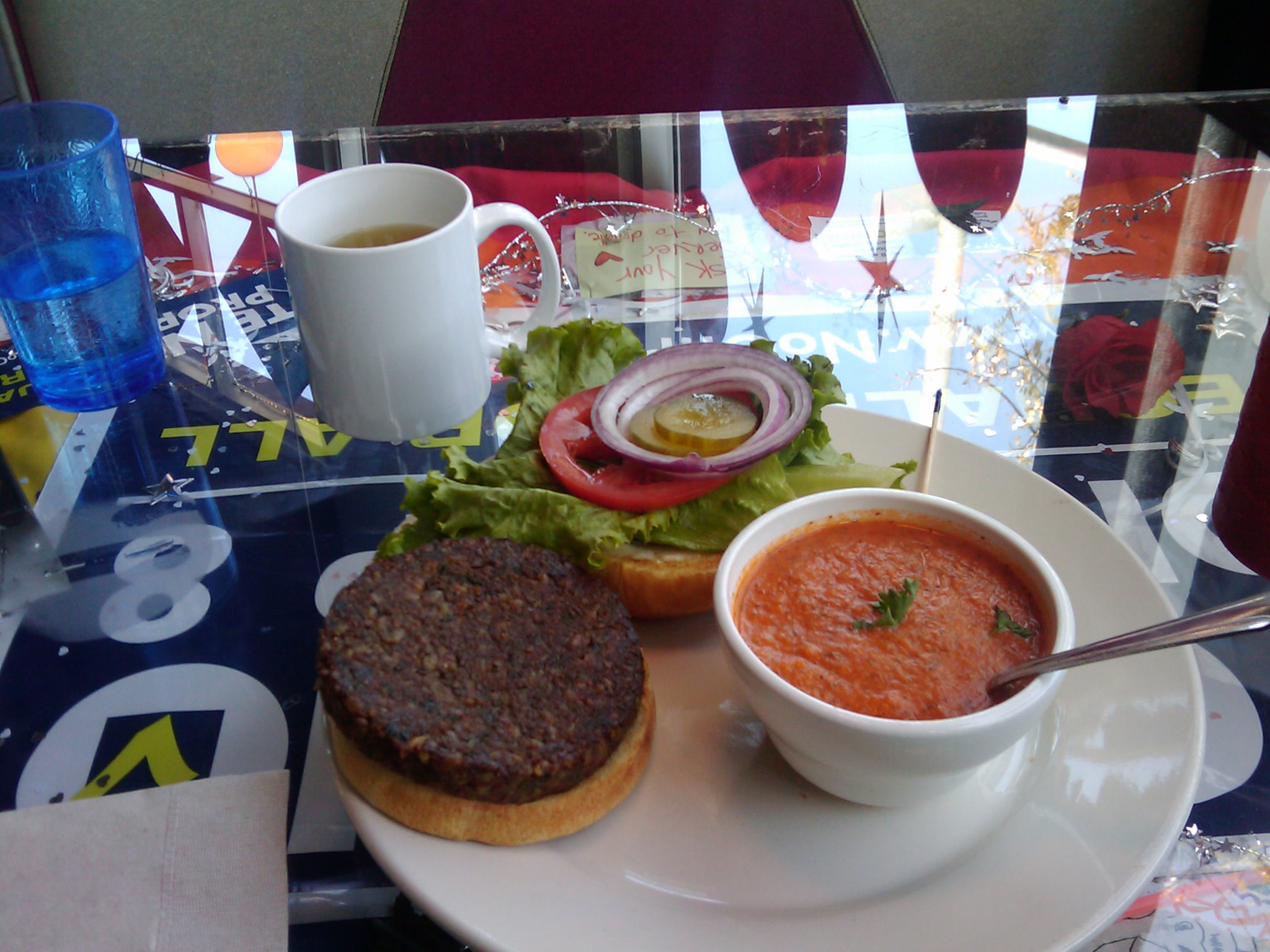
Veggie burger at the Saturn Cafe

The menu at the Saturn Cafe features typical American diner food in an all-vegetarian incarnation, including breakfast fare such as breakfast burritos and pancakes; sandwiches such as club sandwiches, FLTs (vegan BLTs), patty melts, and veggie burgers; Mexican-style offerings such as nachos and taquitos; beverages such as milkshakes and organic beer; and various other offerings, including organic salads, soups, and veggie corndogs. An East Bay Express review noted a "mercifully ungreasy" serving of steak-cut French fries. The Saturn offers nine different burgers, five with its "signature" burger patty (made from organic brown rice and black beans with organic vegetables, almond meal, rice flour, and spices) and the other four with its "chix" patty (imitation chicken). The Daily Californian writer Annie Chang describes the patties as tasting "amazingly similar to actual meat".

Chang opines that the restaurant's cuisine is appealing to most customers, including those who regularly eat meat. In a review, staff and contributors to the East Bay Express similarly describe the Saturn as having a menu with diverse options that appeal to vegetarians and others with restrictive diets as well as those do not follow such diets. While naming it the best vegan option for the 2013 edition of "Best of Berkeley", Daily Californian writer Carli Baker argues that it is "the perfect spot for friends of all dietary guidelines" and praises it for its large menu and vegan interpretations of numerous dishes.

The Saturn Cafe uses Fakin' Bacon made from soy, and both its milkshakes and its nachos can be ordered vegan. Colleen Hubbard of Chowhound opines that its vegan milkshake is the standard of comparison for all such milkshakes. Its non-vegan shake is made from McConnell's ice cream, and can be topped with berries, chocolate cookie crumbs, and organic peanut butter; The Daily Meal named it the 11th best milkshake in the United States. The Saturn's chocolate peanut butter shake was named one of "7 vegetarian things to eat in Berkeley before you graduate" by Daily Californian writer Sarah Branoff. Other dessert options at the restaurant include cakes, cupcakes, and ice cream.

Since reopening in Oakland in 2022, the Saturn Cafe continues to serve traditional favorites such as its "Chicken" Avocado Club sandwich, as well as new items such as its Impossibly Hot & Spicy Burrito.
