= Jennifer Blowdryer =

American writer, musician, and performer

- Born: Jennifer Megan Baring-Gould Waters; 1961 (age 64–65)
- Origin: Berkeley, California
- Genres: punk rock; spoken word
- Years active: 1977 - present
- Formerly of: Jennifer and the Blowdryers; White Trash Debutantes
- Website: Jennifer Blowdryer on Bandcamp

Jennifer Blowdryer (born Jennifer Megan Baring-Gould Waters; born 1961) is an American writer, musician, journalist, and performer. She is known for fronting the San Francisco punk band The Blowdryers (1977–1979), for her long-running column in Maximum Rocknroll, for producing and MC-ing the Smut Fest performance series (from 1988), and for her books of fiction, memoir, and essays published across four decades. She has lived in New York City's Lower East Side since the mid-1980s.

== Early life and the San Francisco punk scene ==
Jennifer Megan Baring-Gould Waters grew up in Rhode Island, Berkeley, Oakland, and San Francisco. As a Berkeley high school student in the mid-1970s she was drawn into the emerging San Francisco punk scene. In 1977, at approximately age 16 or 17, she began fronting a band she called The Blowdryers — the source of her stage name — performing at two of the scene's central venues, the Mabuhay Gardens and The Deaf Club. Only one live recording from the band's run is known to exist.

== Move to New York City ==
In 1984 Blowdryer published her first book, Modern English: A Trendy Slang Dictionary, with San Francisco's Last Gasp press. That same year she received a fellowship to the Writing Division of Columbia University, and subsequently relocated to New York City. She was among the original members of the San Francisco punk band White Trash Debutantes, which held its first show at The Stone in San Francisco on 30 August 1986, opening for Divine. In New York she became a monthly columnist for Maximum Rocknroll and later wrote for New York Press and Downtown (SoHo Arts Weekly). Her fiction appeared in BOMB Magazine.

== Smut Fest ==
Beginning in 1988, Blowdryer produced and MC-ed a performance series called Smut Fest, initially staged at a Tribeca lap-dancing establishment. Regular performers included Annie Sprinkle, Veronica Vera, and Danielle Willis. In 1995, a Smut Fest segment—featuring Blowdryer, Sprinkle, and Willis—was filmed for the HBO documentary series Real Sex (Episode 14, "Wild Cards Special"), with the HBO shoot taking place at the Angel Orensanz Foundation on Norfolk Street, Manhattan.

== Film ==
Blowdryer appeared as herself in the 1986 semi-documentary film Kamikaze Hearts, directed by Juliet Bashore. In 2022, a restored 2K version was released by Kino Lorber; Blowdryer and Bashore appeared in a Q&A at Nitehawk Williamsburg, following a screening of the restoration. She also had a role in the cult San Francisco drag film Vegas in Space (1991), directed by Phillip R. Ford.

== Later writing and performance ==
Blowdryer has continued to write, record, and perform in New York City. The Jennifer Blowdryer Band has performed regularly at venues including the Nuyorican Poets Cafe, Bowery Poetry Club, ABC No Rio, and Tompkins Square Park. She has taught English to asylum seekers through volunteer programmes in lower Manhattan. Her 2020 publication Kicked Out: The 86'd Project (Pedestrian Press) is an oral-history collection of interviews with people who had been barred from bars, apartments, or other spaces, assembled over approximately thirty years. Her most recent book as of 2024 is Music A–Z, published by Zeitgeist Press. In 2019 she spoke at the Bowery Poetry Club memorial for poet and A Gathering of the Tribes founder Steve Cannon, alongside Paul Beatty, Bob Holman, and others.

== Sources ==
- Mitchell, Lincoln A. (2019). San Francisco Year Zero: Political Upheaval, Punk Rock, and a Third-Place Baseball Team. New Brunswick, NJ: Rutgers University Press. ISBN 978-1-9788-0734-1.
- Mitchell, Lincoln A. (October 22, 2019). "Dead Kennedys in the West: The Politicized Punks of 1970s San Francisco". Literary Hub.
- "Book Panel: 'San Francisco Year Zero: Political Upheaval, Punk Rock, and a Third-Place Baseball Team'". Department of History, Columbia University. February 5, 2020.
- "'San Francisco Year Zero' with Lincoln Mitchell". Bergino Baseball Clubhouse. December 2, 2019.
- Dirksen, Dirk (2021). Stark, James; Turner, Ron (eds.). Shut Up You Animals!!! The Pope is Dead — A Remembrance of Dirk Dirksen: A History of the Mabuhay Gardens. San Francisco: Last Gasp. ISBN 978-0-86719-874-4.
- Blowdryer, Jennifer (April 11, 2012). "When the Dull Normal Marries the Grifter And the Disillusioned Patsy Travels Abroad". BOMB.
- DiVenti, Tom (2024). "Her Humor Is Infectious, Like An STD". Splice Today.
- "Kamikaze Hearts". AFI Catalog of Feature Films. American Film Institute.
- "Truth or Fiction: Juliet Bashore on Kamikaze Hearts". Screen Slate. July 19, 2022.
- "Danielle Willis: 'Dogs in Lingerie' author reflects on 30-year anniversary". Bay Area Reporter.
- Anderson, Lincoln (2019). "Epic farewell for Steve Cannon, of A Gathering of the Tribes". The Villager.
- "Real Sex (HBO Series: 1990–2009) — Complete Docuseries". Internet Archive.
- Blowdryer, Jennifer (July 30, 2020). "Kicked Out: The 86'd Project (Excerpt)". A Gathering of the Tribes.
- Blowdryer, Jennifer (2024). "Diva Exemption Clause". Poetry Bay.
- Cristi, A.A. (January 5, 2024). "NYC Performing Arts Legend Jennifer Blowdryer To Hold EP Launch Concert At Mercury Lounge". BroadwayWorld.
- "Jennifer Blowdryer". Apathy Press Poets.
