= 2015 San Francisco mayoral election =

- November 3, 2015
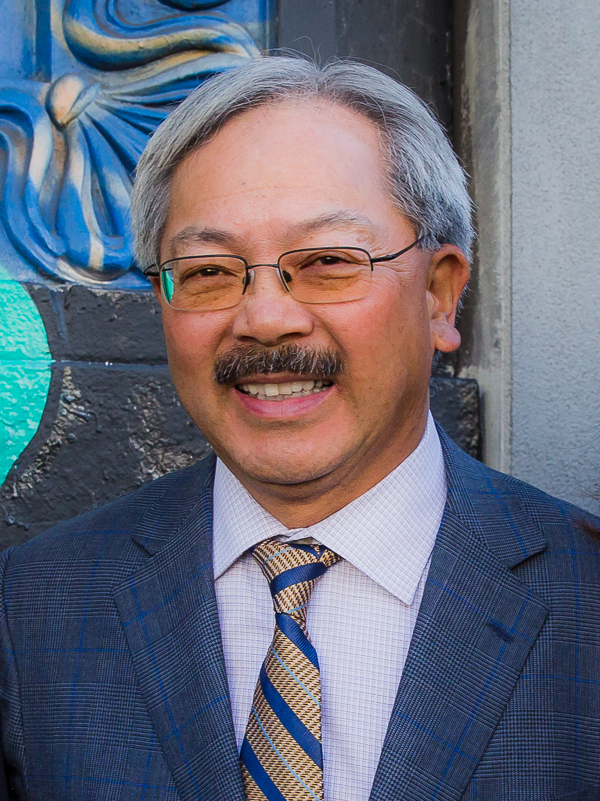

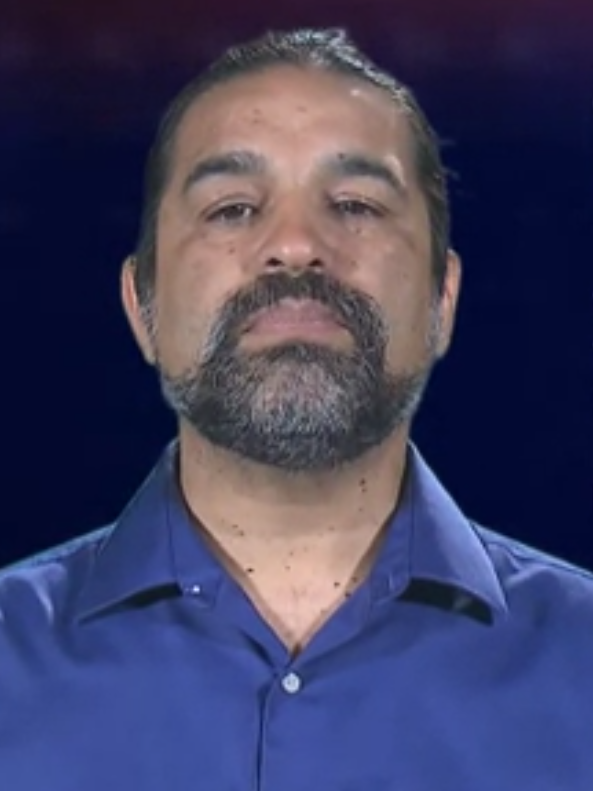

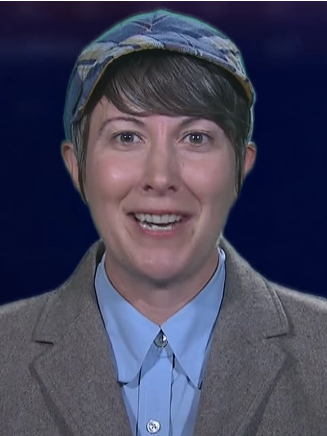

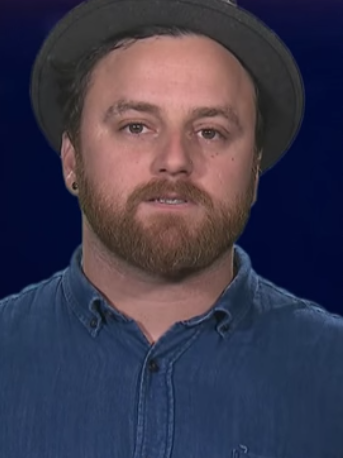
Candidate	Ed Lee	Francisco Herrera
Popular vote	105,298	28,638
Percentage	55.3%	15.0%
Candidate	Amy Farah Weiss	Stuart Schuffman
Popular vote	23,099	18,211
Percentage	12.1%	9.6%
- Results by supervisorial district Lee: <40% 40–50% 50–60% 60–70%
Mayor before election
Ed Lee
Democratic
Elected mayor
Ed Lee
Democratic

The 2015 San Francisco mayoral election took place on November 3, 2015, to elect the Mayor of San Francisco, California. Incumbent Mayor Ed Lee won re-election to a second term in office. All local elections in California are nonpartisan.

== Candidates ==
In November 2015, incumbent Mayor Ed Lee declared that he would stand for reelection for a second term as mayor. State Senator Mark Leno had considered running but ultimately decided against it. Former Mayor Art Agnos, City Attorney Dennis Herrera, Public Defender Jeff Adachi and former State Assemblyman Tom Ammiano all also declined to run. Initially, local media speculated that Lee would run for reelection unopposed. Lee was ultimately opposed by five candidates: Kent Graham, Francisco Herrera, Reed Martin, Stuart Schuffman, and Amy Farah Weiss.

== Election results ==
Municipal elections in California are officially non-partisan, though most candidates in San Francisco do receive funding and support from various political parties. Instant-runoff voting, also known as ranked-choice voting, was used in the election. Lee was reelected with a majority of the vote in the first round of votes, and no transferring of votes was required.

San Francisco mayoral election, 2015
Candidate	Votes	%
Ed Lee (incumbent)	105,298	55.3
Francisco Herrera	28,638	15.0
Amy Farah Weiss	23,099	12.1
Stuart Schuffman	18,211	9.6
Kent Graham	8,775	4.6
Reed Martin	4,612	2.4
Write-in candidates	1,764	0.9
Total votes	184,021	100.0
