= The Battle of Tuntenhaus =

1991 Documentary film about The Tuntenhaus, a gay squat on Berlin's Mainzer Strasse

- Directed by: Juliet Bashore
- Produced by: Cheryl Farthing; Rebecca Dobbs
- Cinematography: Juliet Bashore; Constantine Giannaris; Stefan Piwko
- Edited by: Peter Webber; Androu Morgan; Melody London
- Music by: Kevin Mills; John Eacott
- Production companies: Maya Vision Production; (for Channel Four)
- Release dates: 1991 (Part 1); 1992 (Part 2)
- Running time: 45 minutes
- Country: Germany
- Language: German

The Battle of Tuntenhaus is a 1991 documentary film directed by Juliet Bashore. The documentary follows the inhabitants of the Tuntenhaus ("house of queers") a gay and drag queen squat on Mainzer Strasse in East Berlin.

== Synopsis ==
The first part of the documentary introduces the Tuntenhaus ("house of queers") – a gay and radical drag queen squat on Mainzer Strasse in East Berlin, in 1990; the occupation is one of many on the street, which was known as a "hotbed of revolutionary and anti-fascist activity."

The film follows the inhabitants as they go about their daily lives: communal dinners, love relationships, fortifying the squat against Nazi attack. The film documents a small number of residents who agreed to appear on camera, depicting aspects of their daily lives such as communal meals, personal relationships, and preparations against potential Nazi attacks.

The main narrative emphasizes dramatic incidents, including possible confrontations with neo-Nazis, although such clashes did not ultimately occur. One example is a scene in which the occupiers set out for a counter-protest that ultimately proved to be a feint. The squatters are evicted by West German police on 14 November 1990, as part of the Battle of Mainzer Strasse.

In part two of the documentary, a year later, Bashore revisits some of the locations and interviews some of the former squatters again.

== Production ==
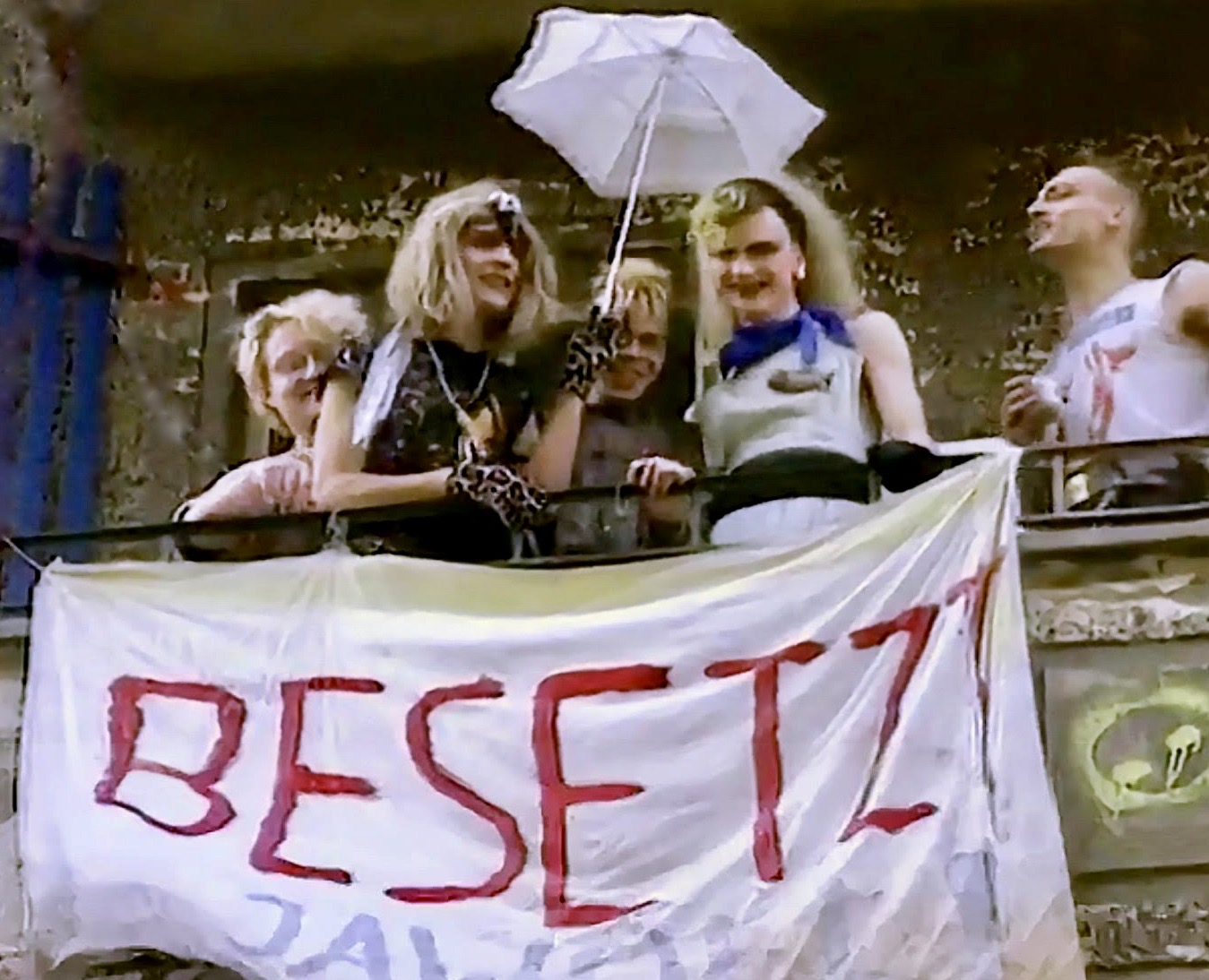
Tuntenhaus squatters on the balcony of Tuntenhaus Forellenhof at MainzerStrasse 4, summer 1990. From left: Lars, Paula, Louis, Pünktchen & Mutti (Basti).

The Tuntenhaus was a gay and drag queen squat occupied at Mainzer Strasse 4 in East Berlin following the fall of the Berlin Wall in 1990. The documentary depicts life in the Tuntenhaus. The focus of the film is closely linked to its production history. Director Juliet Bashore had initially been commissioned by the BBC to produce a documentary about neo-Nazis in the newly reunified Berlin. That project did not achieve the intended results, as the neo-Nazi squatters were less willing to participate on camera.

By contrast, members of the gay squatter community were more open to being filmed, which led to their becoming the central subjects of the documentary. It was directed by Juliet Bashore for British broadcaster Channel 4. Part one is 25 minutes long and part two is 20 minutes.

== Critical reception and legacy ==
Film critic Kevin Thomas, wrote it is "a tender, angry account of an East Berlin squatters commune created by gays and drag queens that is systematically destroyed and looted by West German military police in the immediate wake of reunification; ironically, Neo-Nazis, who had their own squatters commune nearby, supported reunification as strongly as the inhabitants of Tuntenhaus opposed it."

Die Tageszeitung, said the film "is about left-wing dreams and utopias and how they burst" and called the film "a wonderful contemporary document about Berlin shortly after reunification and the autonomous squatter scene, and above all about queer people who tried to create their very own ecosystem."

The Battle of Tuntenhaus has been discussed as an important documentation of radical queer history and as a unique artifact of autonomous and squatter movements. The Tuntenhaus itself was recreated as a squat on Kastanienallee and later legalized.

A 2022–2023 installation at the Schwules Museum in Berlin, curated by Bastian Krondorfer, featured sequences from The Battle of Tuntenhaus throughout the exhibit, and included a life-sized simulacrum of the squat recreated by installation designer Bri Schlögel, based on scenes from the film, alongside video installations by Vinzenz Damm. The Exberliner reported that the documentary was also screened at the open air cinema in Friedrichshain.

== See also ==
- German reunification
- Culture of Germany
- List of LGBTQ-related films of 1991
