= White Trash Debutantes =

San Francisco–based punk rock band

- Origin: San Francisco, California, United States
- Genres: Punk rock; pop punk
- Years active: 1986–present
- Labels: Alternative Tentacles; MCA Japan; Beer City; Rockaway Records
- Members: Ginger Coyote; Chelsea Rose; Pauli Gray; Eric Stickbag; Lynnelektra; Christie Call; Cliff
- Past members: Jimmy Crucifix; Jeff Stofan; Cujo; Roddy Bottom; Tonia Bodley; Rhiannon Pollock; Jake Goldman; Dan Humes; Johny (Trash/Vile) Sosa; Lula Perla; Gere Fenellie; Billy Gould; Lynne Perko; Amy Talaska; Laura Milligan; Margaret Cho; Jennifer Blowdryer; Patty Pierce; Heather Mahan Sanchez; Larry "Greenbud" Bergin; Kevin Gambetti; Neil Smith; Aaron Cutchin; Adam Grais; and many others on various compilations, Beer City Records vinyl ep, tours, etc.
- Website: www.whitetrashdebutantes.com

The White Trash Debutantes are an American punk rock band from San Francisco, California, United States, active since 1986.

== Origins ==
White Trash Debutante deals with issues of gender equality and transcendence. The band's original line-up featured thirteen musicians, including lead vocalist Ginger Coyote, vocalists Ariana Uptime and Cindy Uptime, vocalist Roy Wonder, bassist Billy Gould, drummer Michael Crawford, guitarist Jay Crawford, trumpet player Terra Leong, harmonica player Jon Sugar, as well as Jennifer Blowdryer, Dean Thomas. White Trash Debutante played its first show on August 30, 1986 at The Stone in San Francisco, opening for Divine.

One critic wrote: "Punk rock has always had its socio-political agitators as well as bands that simply wanted to entertain; White Trash Debutantes are a perfect example of the latter."

Perhaps the political underpinnings of White Trash Debutantes message are not so obvious. A careful listening to their music may betray a commitment to mindless rebellion, sexual deviance, and solipsism: Their music abuts head-on with the rush toward fascism, the lack of compassion, and the aimless goals of the 'American Dream.'

The White Trash Debutantes played an early show at San Francisco's Covered Wagon Saloon on October 18, 1989 for a birthday party for Punk Globe Editor and Debutante Ginger Coyote.

Joey Ramone invited them to partake in his "Circus Of the Perverse" party in New York City playing with the likes of Debbie Harry, Bebe Buell, Ronnie Spector, Lemmy (Motörhead) and the Ramones in 1990.

== Film work ==
George Michalski, the Musical Director for the hit CBS Drama, "Nash Bridges" began using their material on the show's soundtrack.

White Trash Debutantes was featured in the full-length movie "Blast Off.. Shonen Knife" by filmmaker David Markey. Appeared in the documentary film "A Regular Frankie Fan" about fans of the cult film "The Rocky Horror Picture Show." Appeared in the feature film "Tweek City", shot in San Francisco; directed by Eric G. Johnson. The band's music also was used in the film's soundtrack.

== Awards ==
The White Trash Debutantes won the Rockies award for "Best Punk Band 2003" and the "Best Punk Band 2004" at the Rock City News Awards.

White Trash Debutantes were named "Best 2004 Underground Punk Band" and Ginger Coyote "Best 2004 Underground Diva" by Demons In Exile.

== Noteworthy events ==
Ginger Coyote and Jayne County recorded two songs together in June 2006--"Rock n Roll Republikkkan (renamed from "Punk Rock Republican")," in which Jayne and Ginger name some well known 'Republikkkans' in the music industry; "Trans-Generation," a song written by Jayne County as an anthem for those with gender identity issues.

White Trash Debutantes played a memorial tribute for the late Dirk Dirksen "The Pope Of Punk" at The Great American Music Hall along with Jello Biafra and many others.

The band has toured the United States, Canada, Mexico and Japan playing with such notables as Rancid, the Ramones, Green Day, Blondie and The Offspring.

The band generated a lot of publicity when they invited notorious former Olympic skater Tonya Harding to join the band.

At one time, they also had, as a member, an 85-year-old, Patty Pierce (who is featured in the book, Ring Master, by Jerry Springer).

The band has also been featured on many television programs such as Jerry Springer, E Gossip, Inside Edition, Late Night With Conan O'Brien, MTV News and Entertainment Tonight.

== Discography ==
- 1991 - San Francisco (Alternative Tentacles)
- 1994 - Crawl For It (Desperate Attempt Records)
- 1994 - The McRackins/White Trash Debutantes (Helter Skelter Records)
- 1996 - It's Raw... But You Live For It (206 Records)
- 1997 - My Guy's Name Is Rudolf (206 Records)
- 1998 - Rock On Sister Friends (Beer City Records)
- 1999 - Split with PSY-9 (PSY-9 Records)
- 2001 - What's It All About? with Cell Block 5 (Orange Peal Records)
- Cheap Date (Teen Rebel Records)
- A Prom Night Gone Bad (WTD Records)

=== Compilations ===
Song	Year	Album	Type	Label	Ref
"Bad In Bed"	1996	Let There Be Singles	CD	Alternative Tentacles	
"Bad In Bed"	1998	Holy Gobstoppers Bat Man!! Another Compilation Maximumrocknroll Won't Like!!	CD	Slap Happy Records	
"Bill Dakota"	1996	Let There Be Singles	CD	Alternative Tentacles	
"Boys & Booze"	1996	The New Breed Volume Three	CD	G.I. Productions	
"Boys & Booze"	2005	Criminal Damage	CD	Electricult Records	
Crack Of A Whip	2002	Dropped On The Head Vol. II	CD	Illbilly Records	
"Disobedience"	2001	Punks, Skins & Rude Boys Now! Vol. 6	CD	Rock'n'Roller	
"FUCK OFF!"	1997	Ramencore Volume I	CD	Burnt Ramen Records	
"Hey Nick... You Did Okay"	2000	H.E.A.R. This	CD	Sub City Records	
"Hey Nick... You Did Okay"	2022	Punk For Ukraine Vol. #3	CD	Grimace Records	
"Judy Is A Punk" (Ramones cover)	2005	Todos Somos Ramones	CD	Rockaway Records	
"Judy Tenuta"	1999	...Cool Music For The Millenium... (In The Name Of Friendship Vol. 2)	CD	PSY-9 Records	
"Judy Tenuta"	?	L.A.P.D Vol 1	CD	LAPD Records	
"La Vida Loca"	2005	Put Some Pussy In Your Punk!!! Vol. 2	CD	On The Rag Records	
"Let's Do It"	2000	Punk's Revenge! Black Eyes And Broken Bottles Volume 2	CD	Beer City Records	
"Little Bit O' Whore"	1997	Ramencore Volume I	CD	Burnt Ramen Records	
"Little Bit O' Whore"	2000	Riot On The Rocks Vol. 4	CD	Safety Pin Records	
"Ms. Jane"	1997	The Unpunk Album	CD	206 Records	
"Part Time Celebrity"	2003	It's Not Just Boys' Fun	CD	Wolverine Records	
"Punk Rock - It Ain't Brain Surgery"	1998	Evil Surfin' Dread	CD	PSY-9 Records	
"Punk Rock Republican"	1999	Black Eyes And Broken Bottles ...We're Done Being Harassed!	12" Vinyl/CD	Beer City Records	
"Punk Rock Republican"	2002	A Fistful of Rock N' Roll Volume 8	CD	Victory Records	
"Rudolf"	2000	Stranglehold: Punk Rock Across America	CD	Triple X Records	
"What's A Girl To Do?"	1996	Axhandle Punk Compilation	CD	Axhandle Records	
"What's A Girl To Do?"	2003	Rebel Noise Comp Volume 1	CD	Rebel Noise	
