= Joe Safdie =

American poet (born 1953)

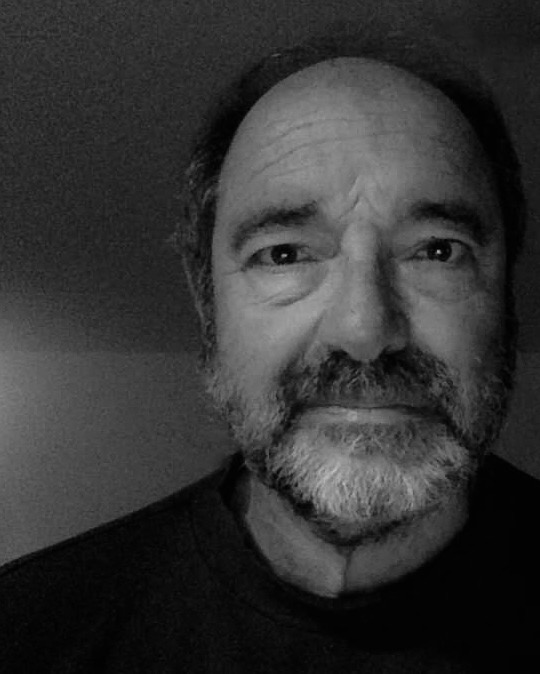
- Born: 4 April 1953 (age 73); Oklahoma City, Oklahoma, U.S.
- Years active: 1973-present

Joe Safdie (born April 4, 1953) is an American poet, critic, and educator. He's published seven books of poems as well as essays in journals including Jacket ("Ed Dorn and the Politics of Love" and "Isn't it Romantic?"), Jacket 2, and The Los Angeles Review of Books, and most recently, in March 2021, Caesura. In February 2020 he presented a paper entitled "Edward Dorn, Satire, and the Via Negativa" at the Louisville Conference on Literature and Culture; it was later published in Dispatches from the Poetry Wars and featured on academia.edu. While writer-in-residence at the Gloucester Writers Center in June 2016, he presented "Charles Olson and Finding One's Place," later published in the Journal of Poetics Research. He also edited the literary magazines Zephyr (early 1980s) and Peninsula (late 80s-early 90s). After 28 years of teaching English at various colleges, he retired in 2019 and moved to Portland, Oregon, continuing a pattern of living in cities on the West Coast of North America including, in reverse order, Encinitas, California, Seattle, Washington, and Bolinas, California (the last two punctuated by three years in the Czech Republic in the early 1990s).

== Biography ==
His first chapbook, Wake Up the Panthers, was published in 1974, when he was still an undergraduate at University of California, Santa Cruz, studying primarily with Norman O. Brown, Lynn Sukenick and George Hitchcock. He was there from 1973 to 1979 and received a bachelor's degree. He then received a fellowship to the writing program at the University of Colorado Boulder and received a terminal master's degree in English there in 1979, studying with Alan Dugan and Edward Dorn, among others. He also attended and taught at San Diego Mesa College.

He moved to Bolinas, California in 1983 where he met his wife Sara (née Schrom) Safdie; they married in 1985. His next publications date from that time: Saturn Return (Smithereens Press, 1983) and Spring Training (Zephyr Press, 1985), both of them with illustrations by the noted artist Arthur Okamura. September Song was published by O Press in 2000, when he was living and teaching in Seattle, and after moving to San Diego in 2005 he published his fifth chapbook, Mary Shelley’s Surfboard, with Blue Press. His full-length books are Scholarship (BlazeVOX 2014) and Coastal Zone (Spuyten Duyvil 2016).

A hybrid chapbook, The Secular Divine, came out in 2022 from Spuyten Duyvil, and two books are scheduled to appear in 2023: Greek to Me, selected poems largely dealing with Greek mythology from Chax Press, and Poetry and Heresy, a collection of essays, from MadHat Press.
