= Juliet Bashore =

American film director

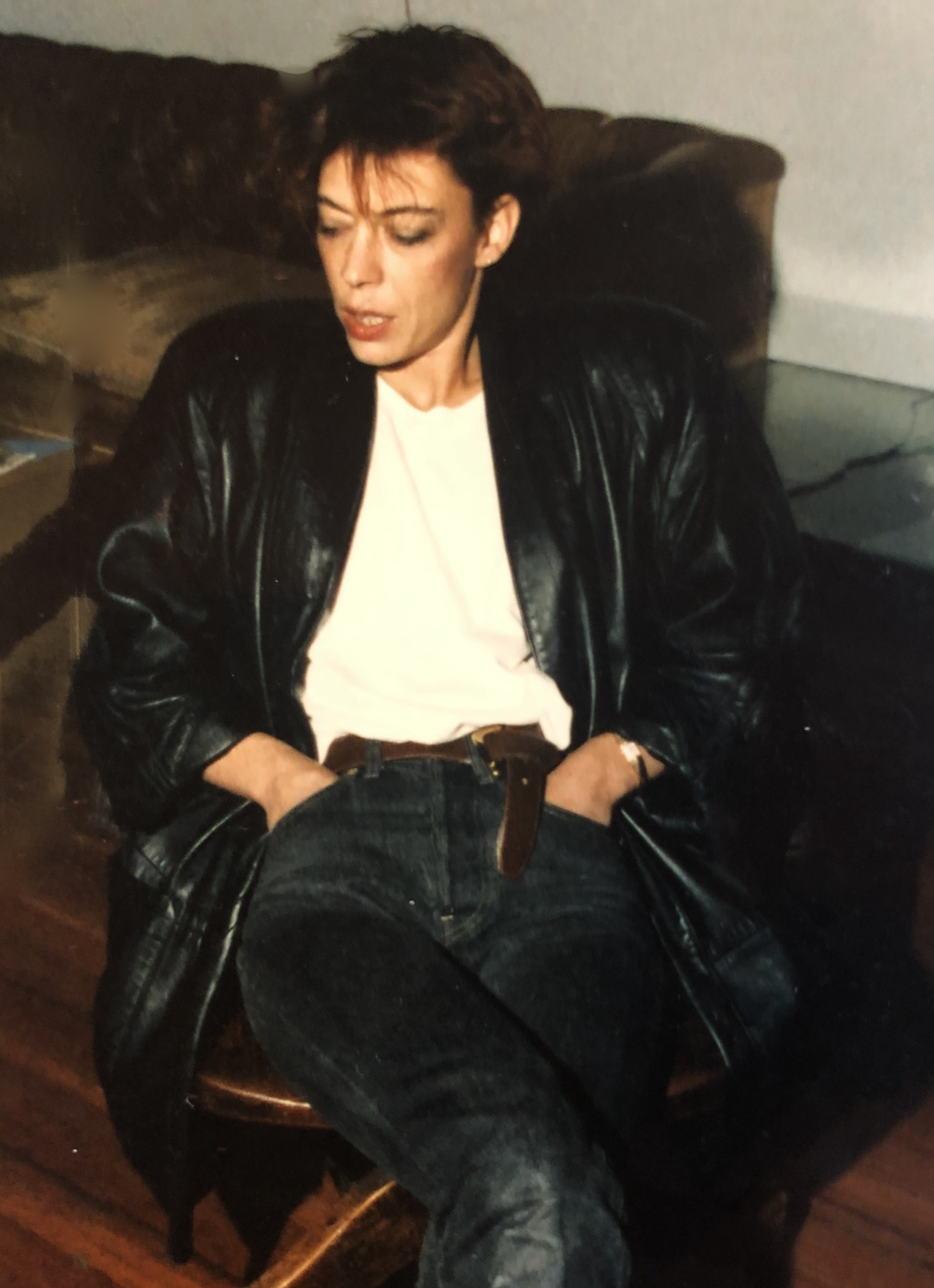
Juliet Bashore in 1986

Juliet Bashore (born 31 December 1956) is an American filmmaker. She is best known for her award-winning feature film Kamikaze Hearts (1986), a pseudo-documentary set in the Golden Age of Porn in San Francisco.

== Life ==
Bashore studied English literature and film at the University of California, Santa Cruz and received a Master's degree in directing at the American Film Institute’s Center for Advanced Film and Television Studies. She has been nominated for a Guggenheim Fellowship. She is the niece of conservative politician Lee T. Bashore.

After her studies, Bashore worked as an intern on George Csicsery’s film Television, The Enchanted Mirror (1981). She also worked as a producer and associate producer in San Francisco at Target Video, Videowest and video collective Optic Nerve.

Her film Kamikaze Hearts was shot in 1983 and released in 1986. It was based on the lives of two women lovers, Sharon Mitchell and Tigr Mennett, working in the pornography industry in San Francisco’s Golden Age. Bashore met Mennett while working as a crew member on a pornographic film. Jonathan Rosenbaum called the film "alternately distressing, instructive, contestable, and fascinating".

In 1990 she made The Battle of Tuntenhaus, a documentary film about the radical queer squat Tuntenhaus in (then) East Berlin and its conflict with both Neo-Nazis and the German state. In 1992 she made a film that followed the events of the squat since the Battle of Mainzer Straße. The films are a seminal piece of Berlin's queer-anarchist history and a rare document of the autonomous scene in Berlin at the time.

Her production company, Modern Cartoons, based in Venice, Los Angeles, was concentrated on the development of virtual reality hardware and software, and produced a number of groundbreaking works utilizing motion sensor technology including in 1998 the first virtual character (a cartoon doll based on Truman Capote) to appear live in real-time before a television audience, followed by a series for PBS Television, as well as a feature for Miramax Films.

== Filmography ==
- Kamikaze Hearts (1986)
- The Battle of Tuntenhaus, Part 1 (1990)
- The Battle of Tuntenhaus, Part 2 (1992)
- The Nervous Breakdown of Philip K. Dick (1996, as “Judy Bee”)
- The Seller (1998, associate producer)
