= Sharon Mitchell =

American sexologist and pornographic actress (born 1950s)

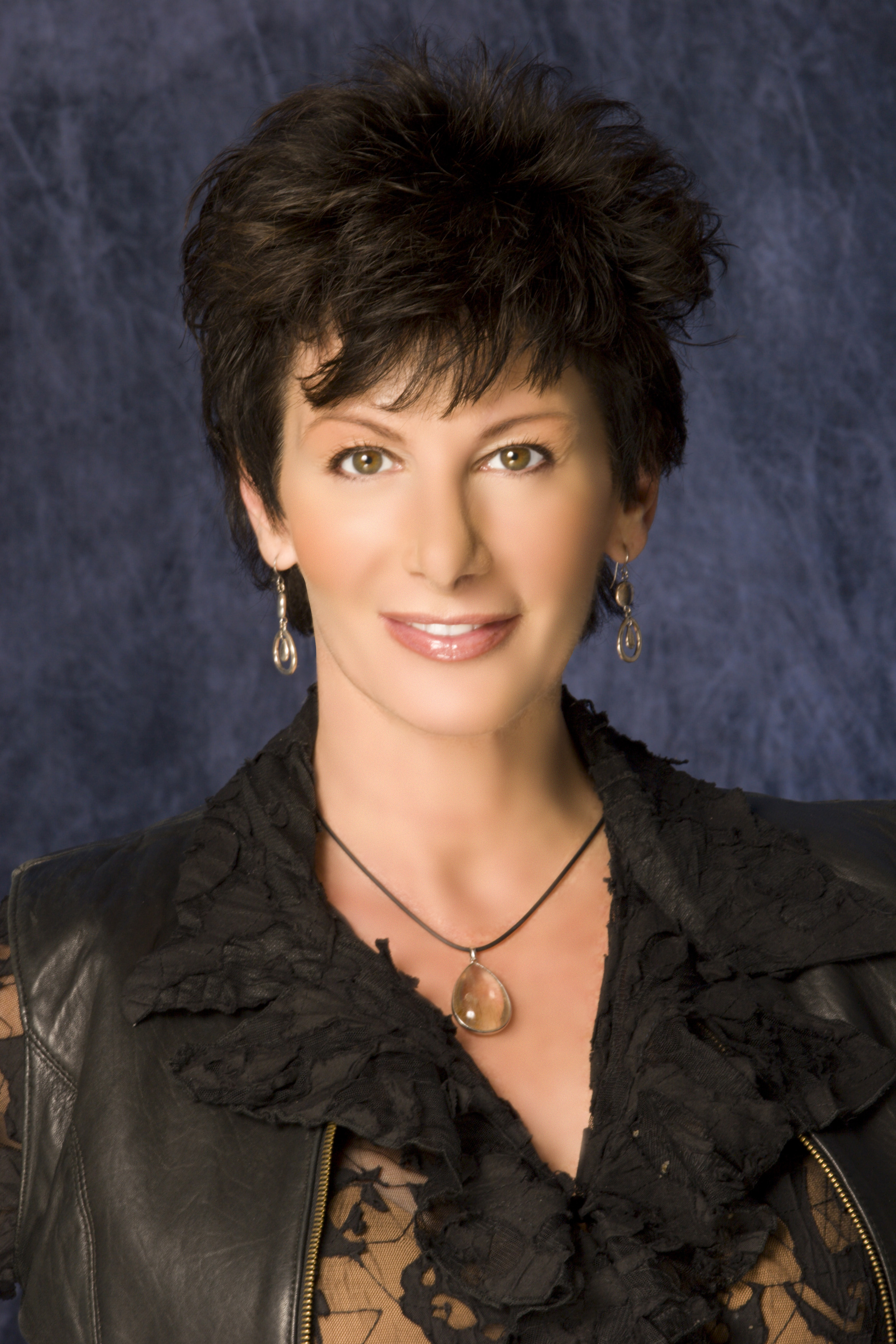
- Mitchell in 2006
- Born: 1957 or 1958 (age 68–69)
- Occupations: Sexologist; pornographic film actress; director

Sharon Mitchell (born 1957 or 1958) is an American sexologist and former pornographic film actress and director. In 1998, she founded the Adult Industry Medical Health Care Foundation (AIM), which tested over 1,000 adult film performers per month before a 2011 data breach led to a lawsuit and the clinic's closure.

== Early life and career ==
An only child, Mitchell was adopted and raised Roman Catholic in Monmouth County, New Jersey. She married briefly at age 17 before becoming an off-Broadway actress and dancer, performing with the Martha Graham Dance Company. She legally changed her last name in 1975 as a tribute to Martha Mitchell, wife of former attorney general John Mitchell. In the mid-1970s, she began appearing in pornographic films such as Captain Lust and the Pirate Women (1977), Sexcapades (1983), Water Power (1976), and The Devil in Miss Jones 2 (1982). She also had small roles in mainstream films, such as Tootsie (1982) and The Deer Hunter (1978).

Mitchell made approximately 1,000 pornographic films over a 20-year career, including 38 as a director. She is the subject of the 1986 verité film Kamikaze Hearts, directed by Juliet Bashore, which follows her behind the scenes of a porn adaptation of Georges Bizet's Carmen and explores her tumultuous relationship with then-girlfriend Tigr Mennett.

During her years in the adult industry, Mitchell developed a heroin addiction.

In 1993, she was presented with the Free Speech Coalition Lifetime Achievement Award.

In 1996, after a male stalker who was obsessed with her porn films assaulted, raped, and nearly killed her, she quit drugs, became a certified addiction counselor, and later obtained a MA and a PhD from the Institute for Advanced Study of Human Sexuality while working a variety of jobs including video engineer's assistant, caterer, florist, dog walker, and maid.

In 1998, Mitchell founded the Adult Industry Medical Health Care Foundation (AIM), an organization which provided information and STD testing to workers in adult entertainment. As of 2004, they were testing 1,200 pornography performers a month. According to the Associated Press, many in the adult industry credit her with raising the visibility of the risks of HIV/AIDS in the pornography industry.

== Awards ==
Mitchell is a member of the AVN Hall of Fame and XRCO Hall of Fame (since 1988). In 2004, she was also inducted into the Porn Block of Fame.

== See also ==
- The Dark Side of Porn – British documentary series (2005–2006)
