= Jey Parks =

- Born: United States
- Other name: Jenny Parks
- Education: California College of Arts, University of California, Santa Cruz
- Occupations: Comics artist, fan artist, scientific illustrator
- Known for: Doctor Mew, The Catvengers, Star Trek Cats, Star Trek: The Next Generation Cats

Jey Parks is an American comics artist, fan artist and scientific illustrator. Parks is most known for their fan art pieces Doctor Mew (Doctor Who's the Doctor as cats) and The Catvengers (the Avengers also as cats) and their books Star Trek Cats and Star Trek: The Next Generation Cats.

== Background ==
Parks started drawing cat versions of people since about age 11 or 12. Around 12, they loved The Phantom of the Opera and had a running gag about The Phantom of the Cats. Eventually, they drew the characters as cats. A few years later, Parks became obsessed with the British television series Doctor Who. Around 2008, Parks began drawing more realistic Doctor Who cats.

Parks has a Bachelor's degree (BFA) in Illustration from the California College of Arts and a graduate degree in scientific illustration from the UC Santa Cruz. Previously, Parks drew wildlife like big cats, birds, dinosaurs, fruit bats, insects, and plants. Their work can be found via iPhone apps for the National Park Service. Parks would regularly attend conventions as C2E2, San Diego Comic-Con, and WonderCon.

Parks' art is drawn and painted digitally via Paint Tool SAI and Photoshop. Parks creates their art digitally with a Cintiq graphics tablet via Photoshop. Their fan art career took off with a table at the 2011 San Diego Comic-Con where they had Doctor Mew buttons and posters as well as when Doctor Mew went viral. Parks became famous due to Doctor Mew. Later, Parks created other fan art pieces as The Catvengers. Doctor Mew represented their most prominent work until Star Trek Cats in 2017. In March 2018, Star Trek Cats was followed-up with Star Trek: The Next Generation Cats. Parks also has a Patreon account.

== Works ==
A commissioned piece depicting a cat as an East German Interkosmos cosmonaut.

=== Books ===
| Title | Publisher | Publication date |
|---|---|---|
| Star Trek Cats | Chronicle Books | 28 February 2017 |
| Star Trek: The Next Generation Cats | Chronicle Books | 27 March 2018 |

=== Comics ===
Marvel Comics Senior Editor Steve Wacker found Jey Parks at their booth at San Diego Comic-Con and approached them to do animal variant covers for Marvel and they said "Absolutely!" Parks has done animal variant covers for issues Iron Man #23, The Superior Spider-Man #27, Thor: God of Thunder #19, and Wolverine and the X-Men #1. On May 13, 2013, Tumblr user sparkysmachine dressed their cat Sir Didymus to match the Thor: God of Thunder #19 animal variant cover. The "mini-Mjolnir and shoulder-thingies" were printed on their PrintrBot Jr. 3D printer. On October 29, 2014, to celebrate National Cat Day, Marvel Comics reposted Parks's animal variant covers on their Facebook page.

=== Fan art ===
Parks's notable works include Doctor Mew, The Catvengers, and Star Trek Cats. Others have included Batman, Deadpool, Dexter, Downton Abbey, Game of Thrones, Hannibal, Harry Potter, How to Train Your Dragon, The Hunger Games, The Lord of the Rings, Sherlock, Spider-Man, Star Wars, Stranger Things, Superman, Supernatural, The Walking Dead, and Wonder Woman. Commissions have included John Hodgman and Gates McFadden as a Doctor Beverly Crusher cat. In 2014, Parks presented a gouache painting of Captain America at the Cat Art Show in Los Angeles, California.

== Reception ==
Newsarama's Chris Arrant called Jey Parks a "noted cat painter." Visual News's Jessica Czeck said Doctor Mew made Jey Parks "internet famous." Bleeding Cool's Rich Johnston pointed out Parks was CatConLA's "[o]ne of the most sought-after artists." Catster's Phillip Mlyner noted they were "a cat illustrator par excellence." Petslady.com's Laurie Kay Olson deigned their work "delightful, entertaining, and more than just a little bit, well, catty." In October 2015, Outlaw Kritters staff selected Parks as the featured artist of the week. Reviewing Star Trek Cats in a thirty-year retrospective, GeekDad's Jules Sherred referred to them as "a great illustrator."

== Personal life ==
Parks has a female black domestic short-haired cat named Mab and a male tuxedo cat Mamoko. In 2013, they lived in San Francisco, California. In 2016, they lived in Denver, Colorado.

== See also ==
- Doctor Who fandom
- List of University of California, Santa Cruz people
