= At Ground Zero =

- Original film poster
- Directed by: Craig Schlattman
- Written by: Craig Schlattman
- Produced by: Ivon Vasali; Craig Schlattman
- Starring: Thomas Jane (credited as Tom Elliott); Aysha Hauer; Brian Brophy
- Cinematography: Bubba Bukowski; Jock Petersen; Kevin Hudnell
- Edited by: Lester Fatt
- Music by: Fran Banish
- Distributed by: Filmopolis Pictures
- Release date: 1994
- Running time: 112 min.
- Language: English

At Ground Zero is a 1993 Independent feature film (released in 1994) directed and written by Craig Schlattman from an original story. It stars Thomas Jane (credited as Tom Elliott), and his then wife, Aysha Hauer (Rutger Hauer's daughter), as a couple on the run across America to find 'home'. Also featured in the film are Brian Brophy as Carman, and Schlattman as Bubba. After receiving critical praise in the European and American press, At Ground Zero was given no advertising and a small release by a minor distributor, Filmopolis Pictures. It has since gone on to be an Indie favorite.

== Plot ==
Tom and Aysha (character names) are at the economic bottom of the LA scene; no money, on drugs, and selling themselves to exist. Tom brains his drug dealer, steals his drugs and the two split town by bus and thumb, heading 'home'. Hitching a ride from a quixotic, dangerous character, Bubba, they put up with his advances until he too is ejected from his own car as the two free themselves from all restraint. Aysha starts a real spiral into heroin, as Tom joins in, but spirits are high. They run into a hilarious character, Carman, who they enlist in their fun, as the trip escalates into the threesomes' investigation of freedom, drugs, and abandonment. Carman leaves the duo, and Aysha falls into a drug appetite Tom can't understand and in frustration he hurts her. Together, but separate, they endure the car ride as they head for Minneapolis and home. In the end, the couples explore the detritus of their family, and lives, and even in betrayal have passion for each other. On a final, bittersweet note, Carman continues his self-destructive ways, as some hope endures.

== Cast ==
- Thomas Jane (credited as Tom Elliott) as Thomas Quinton Pennington
- Aysha Hauer as Aysha Almouth
- Brian Brophy Carman
- Craig Schlattman as Bubba

== Analysis ==
At Ground Zero explores an American culture in the contemporary United States. It follows an alienated couple as they travel across the United States, encountering a range of people and eventually experiencing the breakdown of their relationship. The film combines a contemporary setting with dark humor, realism, and surreal and metaphysical elements. Its story focuses on the couple's relationship and on characters living on the margins of society. The film's visual style has been compared to the films of Michelangelo Antonioni and it has been described as a contemporary Easy Rider.

== Production ==
At Ground Zero was written as an original story by Craig Schlattman, who, at the time, was making short films, documentaries, and still photographs while looking for financing for this film. Tired of waiting, and turned down by every studio he approached, he ran into Thomas Jane and Aysha Hauer while shooting a scene from Hiroshima Mon Amour for another director in which Tom and Aysha were the leads. Craig has said he knew they were perfect for the parts and approached them about being in the film by handing them scripts. A day later he got enthusiastic calls from Tom and Aysha excited to do the parts and be in the film. Craig has acknowledged that he was exploring aspects of his own character in the two leads, and saw in Tom and Aysha a chance for them to use their own experiences in the central love story, and changed the names of the leads, slightly, to let Tom and Aysha use their own names as tools for character. Unable to cast the quirky part of Carman, at the last minute Craig went to Brian Brophy's LA apartment and let him read for the part. Craig cast him on the spot and they prepared to go on the road in the next couple of days.

The movie was shot on the road from Los Angeles to Corpus Christi where part of the cast and all of the crew returned to LA. Tom and Aysha then proceeded to Minneapolis with Craig as director and crew, where the culminating scenes were shot. On the return to LA they grabbed scenes and stole locations along the way. At Ground Zero is a fine example of guerrilla filmmaking at its best. Barely any production budget, some credit cards, a car, some gas, and a desire to finish the film is what motivated everyone. Cast and crew of At Ground Zero were handed the script and asked to make their decision to work on the film based on their reaction to the script, and a realistic understanding of the 'budget' they had to work with. Craig has said the edgy, documentary, direct cinema feel of this film was intentional, and pushed as far as possible considering the budget available. All the actors were given great leeway with the script and encouraged to use their improvisational skills to expand the characters, keep the energy high, and heighten the 'realistic' tone of this story. Craig has said the production technique of using the ups and downs and emotional swings of being with 'strangers' for a month on the road was a conscious decision to expand the emotional swings of the lead characters and their disintegrating relationship, and was helpful for the actors as the story, and everyone's patience, headed for the culminating scenes.

== Reception ==
At Ground Zero premiered at the Rotterdam International Film Festival to enthusiastic, full houses, and went on an extensive festival run in the US and Europe, garnering very positive reviews along the way –

An impressive debut. With dark, dead-pan humor, experimental visual techniques and solid performances, At Ground Zero is a promising first feature.

— Jamie Painter – Film Threat

Powerful and distinctive. Impressive. ... a raw, edgy tale, shot through with dark humor ... Schlattman directs with terrific wit and immediacy. Well acted ... winning portrayals.

— Kevin Thomas – Los Angeles Times

Life on the road with a couple of junkies doesn't get much more interesting than in this impressive first feature by Craig Schlattman. This is a small treasure of independent filmmaking.

— Matt Langdon – LA Weekly
