= Nobody Left to Hate =

2001 book by Elliot Aronson

- Author: Elliot Aronson
- Publisher: Holt Paperbacks
- Publication date: 2001
- ISBN: 9780805070996

Nobody Left to Hate: Teaching Compassion after Columbine is a book by social psychologist Elliot Aronson that explores the implications of the attacks at Columbine.

== Editions ==
- ISBN 0-7167-4132-6
