= Alison Galloway =

- Known for: forensic science reports
- Awards: The San Jose Business Journal named her Silicon Valley's Women of Influence, 2009. She earned the Excellence in Teaching Award, 1993–1994, from the UCSC Academic Senate Committee on Teaching
- Scientific career
- Fields: Anthropology
- Patrons: Galloway was appointed to the executive vice chancellor position at UCSC on 16 September 2010.

Alison Galloway is a forensic anthropologist at the University of California, Santa Cruz. She is best known for her work in identifying the physical remains of Laci Peterson in the Scott Peterson Trial. She co-edited a book called The Evolving Female: A Life History Perspective with Mary Morbeck and Adrienne Zihlmann. (Politics and the Life Sciences Mar2000, Vol. 19 Issue 1, p119, 2p) She is also editor of "Broken Bones: Anthropological Analysis of Blunt Force Trauma" and co-editor of the second edition of that volume. She is also co-author of "Practicing Forensic Anthropology: an eResource" with Susan Kuzminsky.

Galloway was appointed to the executive vice chancellor position at UCSC on 16 September 2010. She replaced David Kliger who retired 2010. She stepped down from the provostship on 31 December 2016 to return to her faculty position prior to final retirement.

== Education ==
She earned her BA with honors in Anthropology, with an emphasis in Archaeology, in 1975 from the University of California, Berkeley. Her master's thesis, entitled "Racial Variation in the Basioccipital", earned Galloway an MA in anthropology, emphasis in physical Anthropology, with a specialization in forensic anthropology in 1985 at the University of Arizona. Galloway continued her education at the University of Arizona with a PhD in Anthropology, emphasis in physical anthropology with two minors, anatomy and physiology. She completed her doctorate in 1988 with her paper entitled, "Long Term Effects of Reproductive History on Bone Mineral Content in Women".

== Professional career ==
Galloway began her professional career in 1988 as an associate professor of Anthropology at the University of Tennessee in Knoxville. She accepted a position as an associate professor at the University of California, Santa Cruz in 1990 and by 2001 was promoted to professor. Meanwhile, in 1996 she became a member of the Disaster Mortuary Operational Response Team, USDHS acting as a forensic anthropologist.

She became vice-chair of the UCSC Division of the Academic Senate in 2001, and was appointed to chair in 2003, stepping down two years later when she accepted an interim position as vice provost of academic affairs. After being named to the position one year later, she remained until 2009, when she was appointed to the position of vice provost and dean of academic affairs/university extension.

Galloway has been an active member of many professional societies during her career, such as the American Board of Forensic Anthropology, serving as a board officer, and the American Association of Physical Anthropology. Galloway is a fellow of the American Academy of Forensic Sciences, and held various executive positions between 1994 and 1997. She served on the editorial board of the Journal of Forensic Sciences from 2008 to 2013.

Galloway stepped down from her position as campus provost and executive vice chancellor (CP/EVC) at UC Santa Cruz in December 2016. She returned to teaching after taking a yearlong break.

=== Forensic cases ===
Galloway credits her inability to smell offensive odors for more than a few seconds for her capacity to deal with some of the difficult aspects of forensic work. She is one of 75 highly skilled forensic anthropologists in the United States, and is regularly called upon by the authorities to provide her expertise.

== Awards ==
Galloway has earned several awards throughout her career. The San Jose Business Journal named her Silicon Valley's Women of Influence, 2009. She earned the Excellence in Teaching Award, 1993–1994, from the UCSC Academic Senate Committee on Teaching and the Mildred Trotter Student Paper Award, April 1987, from the American Association of Physical Anthropologists for her paper entitled "Reproductive History and Bone Mineralization".

She was awarded the J. Lawrence Angel Forensic Anthropology Student Paper Award, in February 1987, American Academy of Forensic Sciences. Her paper was entitled "Estimating Actual Height in the Elderly".

== Contributions ==
Galloway has contributed significantly to academic literature in her field. She has worked with others in the discipline to author many books and papers. Her work on blunt force trauma outlines a theoretical framework for dealing with the many causes of death due to blunt force trauma including falls, strangulation, abuse, accidents and other causes.

In addition, Galloway has authored work outlining decay rates in the dry Arizona climate. She has also argued that variances in formulas used to estimate height in adults needs to be consistent, and that the maximum height along with age altered heights be specified in forensic science reports in order to facilitate matching in missing person reports.
