= Stuart Schuffman =

American travel writer (born 1980)

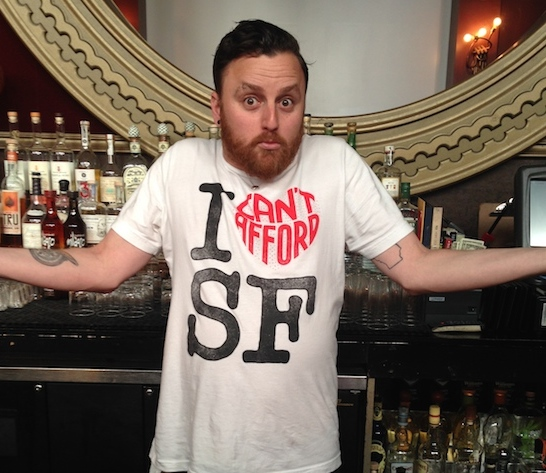
- Stuart Schuffman aka Broke-Ass Stuart
- Born: Stuart Schuffman; December 16, 1980 (age 45); Los Angeles, California, U.S.
- Education: University of California, Santa Cruz (B.A. in American Studies)
- Occupations: Travel writer, television host, journalist
- Writing career
- Notable works: BrokeAssStuart.com; Young, Broke & Beautiful; SFGATE dive bar columnist
- Website: brokeassstuart.com

Stuart Schuffman (born December 16, 1980), also known as Broke-Ass Stuart, is an American travel writer, television host, poet, performer, and journalist based in San Francisco, California. He pioneered budget-living zines and books, created IFC's travel series Young, Broke & Beautiful (2011), and runs BrokeAssStuart.com as “Editor-in-Cheap.” He writes the dive-bar column for SFGate. In 2015, he received 18,211 votes (9.56%) in his San Francisco mayoral campaign.

In October 2025, the San Francisco Board of Supervisors officially declared October 17 to be "Broke-Ass Stuart Day" in San Francisco.

== Early life and education ==
Schuffman was born in Los Angeles and grew up in El Paso, Texas, and San Diego, California. He earned his B.A. in American Studies from the University of California, Santa Cruz.

== Career ==
Schuffman’s media journey began with zines: Broke-Ass Stuart's Guide to Living Cheaply in San Francisco, Volumes 1 (2004) and 2 (2005). Volume 2 won the San Francisco Bay Guardian's Best Local Zine award in its 2005 Best of the Bay issue. These evolved into books published by Seven Footer Press: Broke-Ass Stuart's Guide to Living Cheaply in San Francisco (2007) and Broke-Ass Stuart's Guide to Living Cheaply in New York (2008).

He also contributed to Lonely Planet travel guides and has written for SF Bay Guardian and SF Weekly. He curates BrokeAssStuart.com as “Editor-in-Cheap” and writes the Dive-Bar column for SFGate.

From 2015 to 2021, he penned the “Broke-Ass City” column for the San Francisco Examiner. His bylines have appeared in Condé Nast Traveler, 7x7, SF Weekly, and The Bold Italic, amongst others.

=== Publications and zines ===
- Volume 1 & 2 of the Broke-Ass Stuart's Guide to Living Cheaply in San Francisco zine (2004–2005)
- Broke-Ass Stuart's Guide to Living Cheaply in San Francisco book (2007)
- Broke-Ass Stuart's Guide to Living Cheaply in New York City book (2008)
- Young, Broke & Beautiful: Broke-Ass Stuart’s Guide to Living Cheaply (2011), published alongside the IFC series
- Self-published zine Love Notes and Other Disasters (2014)
- Retrospective zine Slouching Towards Neverland (2022)
- Literary magazine The Dreams I Dreamt: Letters to San Francisco (2024)
- Forthcoming anthology The Worst of Broke-Ass Stuart (2025)

== Television and web series ==
Schuffman co-created and hosted IFC's travel TV show Young, Broke & Beautiful (2011). While the Los Angeles Times described him as “a tireless self-promoter,” and the Boston Globe said the show was “straining too hard to be different,” KQED offered a more positive take: “Young, Broke & Beautiful brings Schuffman’s unique brand of adventurous budget travel to a more mainstream setting but mostly preserves his indie flair.”

In 2014, he began The Kind of Late Show with Broke-Ass Stuart, a live late-night variety show uploaded to YouTube. It featured guests such as Boots Riley and Kari Byron.

In 2019, he co-created and starred in the satirical web series Shaky Ground, which premiered at the Roxie Theater in San Francisco. It was given positive reviews by SF Weekly and the San Francisco Examiner.

== Mayoral campaign ==
In 2015, Schuffman ran for mayor of San Francisco, finishing fourth with 9.56% of the vote. He described his bid as a protest against corporate influence and neglect of affordable living. The ethics commission later issued a fine for a technical campaign filing error, which he explained as an inadvertent mistake saying, “I just didn’t know I couldn’t do that.”
