= Kamikaze Hearts =

1986 American film

- Official re-release poster
- Directed by: Juliet Bashore
- Written by: Juliet Bashore; Tigr Mennett; John Knoop
- Starring: Sharon Mitchell
- Music by: Georges Bizet; Walt Fowler; Paul M. Young
- Production company: Legler/Bashore
- Release date: 1986
- Country: United States

Kamikaze Hearts (alternately titled Fact or Fiction) is a 1986 American quasi-documentary film directed by Juliet Bashore and written by Bashore and Tigr Mennett. It stars Sharon Mitchell, Tigr Mennett, Jon Martin, Sparky Vasque, Jerry Abrahms, and Robert McKenna. The soundtrack was composed by Georges Bizet, Walt Fowler, and Paul M. Young.

The film, while partly staged, is based on the real life relationship between Mitchell and her girlfriend Tigr Mennett, who were both pornographic actresses. In Kamikaze Hearts, a camera crew follows Mitchell, nicknamed "Mitch," as she stars in a porn parody of the opera Carmen that Mennett is directing.

Facets Multi-Media released the film in November 1986. It received a 2K restoration by the UCLA Film & Television Archive and was re-released by Kino Lorber, premiering on May 13, 2022.

== Plot ==
Veteran pornographic actress Sharon Mitchell, nicknamed "Mitch", drives to San Francisco accompanied by a camera crew filming a documentary. She is going to star in a porn parody of Carmen, which is directed by her girlfriend, Tigr, a newcomer to the industry. When Mitch arrives on the set, the documentary crew films her along with various other people involved in the making of the Carmen parody. After filming a rape scene, Mitch dons a mustache, invites the crew to what she calls the "pre-wrap wrap party," and introduces them to more of her coworkers. Each of them are prompted to discuss their own experience with pornography.

Mantra is supposed to perform fellatio on Jon, but pauses mid-scene and becomes distressed, refusing to do so in front of Gerald Greystone, the producer; who then fires her and photographs Jennifer Blowdryer, another actress, coaxing her into displaying more skin than she had initially planned. During another party, cast members fraternize as Tigr speaks to the documentary crew on the role of drugs in her relationship with Mitch.

Mitch disappears from the set before they are about to shoot and Greystone berates Tigr for having paid Mitch in advance. Following a search, Tigr finds Mitch dancing naked at a strip club. After getting into a fight with the club's staff, Tigr is removed from the establishment. When Tigr asks her why she did not show up to the set, Mitch reveals that she had been arrested and spent most of the night in jail. The couple then argues about Tigr telling the people around them about Mitch's drug habit, though Tigr claims that everyone already knows that Mitch is a user. Tigr vents about the situation to Bobby Mac, who converses with her while playing a round of dice.

Mantra returns to the set, asking Tigr to let her redo the oral sex scene as she needs money to pay her rent. However, she requests to do it with Mitch instead of Jon, stating that she no longer does pornography with men. Tigr agrees and Mantra and Mitch film the scene, despite Tigr becoming jealous as it unfolds. Tigr and Mitch get poison oak and take a shower together. Mitch contemplates her career and the people who watch her. As they dry off outside, Tigr expresses her disappointment in Mitch, but notes that she loves her anyways, kissing her before walking off. Sometime later, the couple decide to film themselves injecting themselves with drugs. Comparing the needle to a surrogate penis, Mitch talks to the camera about how she "fucked" Tigr with it with the hopes of maturing their relationship. Tigr expresses her desire to eventually find something more enjoyable than drugs.

== Cast ==
Cast list adapted from Lesbian Film Guide.

- Sharon Mitchell as Mitch
- Tina "Tigr" Mennett as Tigr
- Jon Martin as Jon
- Sparky Vasque as Sparky
- Jerry Abrahms as Gerald Greystone
- Robert McKenna as Bobby Mac

== Background & production ==
Kamikaze Hearts, originally named Fact or Fiction, was conceived after Juliet Bashore, a filmmaking student working on a documentary on the porn industry in San Francisco, met Tigr Mennett. Mennett, an assistant director, was in a relationship with pornographic film actress Sharon Mitchell; the couple met while filming a scene. Obsessed with her girlfriend to the point that she adopted Mitchell's drug habit, (Note: In 2004, Mitchell admitted to having been addicted to heroin for approximately twenty years.) Mennett met with Bashore and convinced her to change the focus of the documentary. Mennett not only starred in the film, but is also credited as one of the writers. Bashore later recalled that Mennett worked on the film with her because she wanted an opportunity to have sex with Mitchell, as Mitchell would not perform any sex acts without the presence of a camera.

Multiple elements of the film are fictional, including the Carmen parody and the leading couple's arguments, which were scripted and storyboarded. While actual people who worked within the porn industry starred in Kamikaze Hearts, these performers improvised, portraying different versions of themselves.

Juliet Bashore began shooting the film in the mid-1980s. It was filmed on location in North Beach, San Francisco, Embarcadero Freeway, and the Mission District, San Francisco.

== Release ==
Kamikaze Hearts received a limited theatrical release in November 1986 by Facets Multi-Media before being played across multiple theaters and sold on home video in the years that followed. The May 31, 1988 edition of The Village Voice wrote that, three days earlier on May 28, the film was shown during the America Gay Film Tour in New York City. The following year, it made its Los Angeles debut on January 30. Furthermore, LA Weekly announced that the film would be played at the Nuart Theatre for three days, beginning on April 26, 1991 and concluding on April 28. The film was released on VHS on November 11, 1991.

The film received a 2K restoration from the UCLA Film and Television Archive and was subsequently re-released by film distributor Kino Lorber. It held its premiere on May 13, 2022, at the Brooklyn Academy of Music in New York City, generating $1,004. The next screening was at the Alamo Drafthouse Cinema on May 20 of the same year.

Kamikaze Hearts won Best Feature Film at the Torino International Gay and Lesbian Film Festival and the San Francisco Film Arts Foundation Film Festival.

== Reception ==
According to the American Film Institute's Catalog of Feature Films, while Kamikaze Hearts garnered mixed reviews following its release, critics tended to be fascinated by its subject matter.

Multiple critics lauded Juliet Bashore for her directing of the film. In a review published by the Los Angeles Times, Kevin Thomas praised her for "wisely" allowing individual viewers to decide which portions are true. Liz Galst of Boston's Gay Community News called Kamikaze Hearts "amazingly powerful," citing its portrayals of Mitch and Tigr's relationship and how pornographic performers navigate the lines between fiction and reality. She went on to note that the film placed Bashore "at the forefront of U.S. non-fiction filmmaking".

The New York Times's Beatrice Loayza said that many portions were disorienting and tedious, comparing the film to an "opioid-induced delirium," but found it memorable as a whole. Jonathan Rosenbaum, writing for the Chicago Reader, also cautioned that the film had the tendency to confuse its viewers. He attributed this to the several purposes that the camera served within Kamikaze Hearts, which included the "seemingly impartial witness" of and "catalyst" for the film's events.

Writing for Another Magazine, James Balmont said that although the lesbian mainstream rejected the film when it was first released, Kamikaze Hearts "remains a milestone in queer cinema."

L.A. Weekly wrote in 1991 that the film "drags you to a certain place – the world of lesbian-junkie porn stars – and keeps you there for 80 minutes. If you're excited by that place, or even if you find that place disturbing, you'll like this film because it's so relentlessly inside the world of naked bodies, make-believe, addiction, despair, two-bit sleaze and two-bit dreams."

In her 1991 book, Looking for Trouble: On Shopping, Gender and the Cinema, Suzanne Moore calls the film "underground film-making of the highest order." She also said of the final scene: "Like pornography itself, the film promises the one big act, the one scene that will make the whole thing right, but never delivers it."

SFe for Time Out magazine said "sometimes the camera is a coolly discriminating, independent viewpoint, sometimes a goggling, peeping eye."
