= Andréa Maechler =

Swiss economist

Andréa M. Maechler (born 1969 in Geneva) is a Swiss economist.

== Career ==
Maechler studied at the University of Toronto, at the Graduate Institute of International and Development Studies in Geneva obtaining a degree in international relations, at the Institut de hautes études en administration publique in Lausanne and at the University of California, Santa Cruz where she received her doctorate in international economics in 2000.

She has worked at the Organization for Economic Cooperation (OECD), the United Nations Conference on Trade and Development (UNCTAD) and the World Trade Organization (WTO). From 2013 to 2014, Maechler was deputy head of the secretariat at the European Systemic Risk Board in Frankfurt. She was deputy head of Global Markets Analysis at the International Monetary Fund in Washington. The department is tasked with monitoring capital markets and assessing systemic risks.

Maechler was elected by the Federal Council on December 17, 2014, as the first woman to be a member of the Governing Board of the Swiss National Bank. She succeeded Jean-Pierre Danthine on July 1, 2015, for the term of office from July 1, 2015, to June 30, 2021. On the Governing Board, she took over the 3rd department, most of which is based in Zurich. This department of the bank includes the financial markets and foreign exchange trading, operational banking and IT.

In 2023, she left the SNB for the Bank for International Settlements.
