= Punk Globe =

Punk fanzine and online magazine

Punk Globe is an American punk fanzine and online magazine. Started in 1977, it was one of the first punk zines to be published in San Francisco.

== Background ==
It was started by Ginger Coyote, and originally distributed on photocopied pages folded together. After its first anniversary, Chris Coyle, manager for SVT, a San Francisco–based punk band, suggested a newsprint format. Ginger Coyote wrote on the website, "We found Grant Printing—a company owned by the influential Fang Family, publishers of Asian Week and the San Francisco Independent Community newspapers (and for a while, the San Francisco Examiner)—for the following 7 years. For our last 2 years, the magazine upgraded to heavier stock white paper printed at SF Litho."

It was published as a fanzine until 1989, when Ginger Coyote started a band called White Trash Debutantes. The content of Punk Globe included a calendar of events, gossip, interviews, record reviews, photos, artwork, the Punk Of the Month Award and the humorous advice column, "Ask Sonny Bono". According to its publisher, "The magazine was lighthearted and a lot of fun... It became a hit, and in the last few years, 25,000 copies were being printed." The online version of Punk Globe surfaced in 2005, and contains some of the old content: articles, ads, artwork, photos and letters from past issues, as well as new artwork and photographs, gossip, news, interviews, CD, DVD, film and book reviews. Recent additions include an Internet forum, Facebook page, and Twitter account. According to Ginger Coyote, the website gets approximately 8,000 hits per day.

== Contributors ==
Punk Globe contributors included Bebe Buell as associate editor and writer, Jello Biafra writing record reviews under the name "The Taste Police", Dorothy Lyman, Marc Floyd (AKA The Floydian Device), Robert Crumb, Jayne County, John Balano, Liz Derringer, De Fen, Rebecca G. Wilson, Joe Jackson, Jon Gries, Lisa Zane, Matt Dillon, August Bernadicou, Ernie Townsend, Lisa Lunney, Joe Dallesandro, Gerry-Jenn Wilson, Ms. Ligaya, Andrew Stevens, Judd Nelson, Lisa Booth, Sharla Cartner, Kim Acrylic, Arika Kaosa, Kathy Peck, Nikki Palomino, Josie Cotton, John Synder, Mark Arnold, Courtney Love, Johnny Paris and Billy Gould.

== See also ==
- Maximum RocknRoll
