= Kate R. Rosenbloom =

Bioinformatics software researcher

Kate R. Rosenbloom is a member of the Encyclopedia of DNA Elements (ENCODE) Consortium. She is a Tech Project Manager and Software Developer at the Center for Biomolecular Science and Engineering, Jack Baskin School of Engineering, University of California Santa Cruz (UCSC), USA. She has been a member of the scientific advisory board to the human proteome project and contributed data integration and visualisation within the GTEx consortium, an international project aiming to understand how genetic variation shapes variation between human tissues.

The pilot stage of ENCODE, involving development of a web browser to show experimental results related to regions on the human genome sequence, was undertaken at UCSC. The university team maintain and develop the UCSC Genome Browser to provide the public with access to genome data from an increasing number of animals, mainly vertebrates. Data provided by the user can also be included. It permits comparisons and some interpretation of the data. The browser was first released in 2001 and an annual update of developments is published each January.

Rosenbloom is the author or co-author of over 35 publications, including:

- Jairo Navarro Gonzalez, Ann S Zweig, Matthew L Speir, Daniel Schmelter, Kate R Rosenbloom, Brian J Raney, Conner C Powell, Luis R Nassar, Nathan D Maulding, Christopher M Lee, Brian T Lee, Angie S Hinrichs, Alastair C Fyfe, Jason D Fernandes, Mark Diekhans, Hiram Clawson, Jonathan Casper, Anna Benet-Pagès, Galt P Barber, David Haussler, Robert M Kuhn, Maximilian Haeussler, W James Kent (2021) The UCSC Genome Browser database: 2021 update Nucleic Acids Research 49 Issue D1, Pages D1046–D1057
- The GTEx Consortium (2020) The GTEx Consortium atlas of genetic regulatory effects across human tissues. Science 369 1318-1330
- Kate R. Rosenbloom, Cricket A. Sloan, Venkat S. Malladi, Timothy R. Dreszer, Katrina Learned, Vanessa M. Kirkup, Matthew C. Wong, Morgan Maddren, Ruihua Fang, Steven G. Heitner, Brian T. Lee, Galt P. Barber, Rachel A. Harte, Mark Diekhans, Jeffrey C. Long, Steven P. Wilder, Ann S. Zweig, Donna Karolchik, Robert M. Kuhn, David Haussler, W. James Kent (2012) ENCODE Data in the UCSC Genome Browser: year 5 update. Nucleic Acids Research 41 D56–D63
