= Young, Broke & Beautiful =

- Genre: Travel documentary
- Starring: Broke-ass Stuart
- Country of origin: United States
- Original language: English
- No. of seasons: 1
- No. of episodes: 6

Original release
- Network: IFC
- Release: June 24 – July 29, 2011

Young, Broke & Beautiful is an American travel documentary television series that debuted on IFC on June 24, 2011. It stars travel guide Broke-ass Stuart touring major American cities on a low budget.
