= Gabriel Filippelli =

American scientist

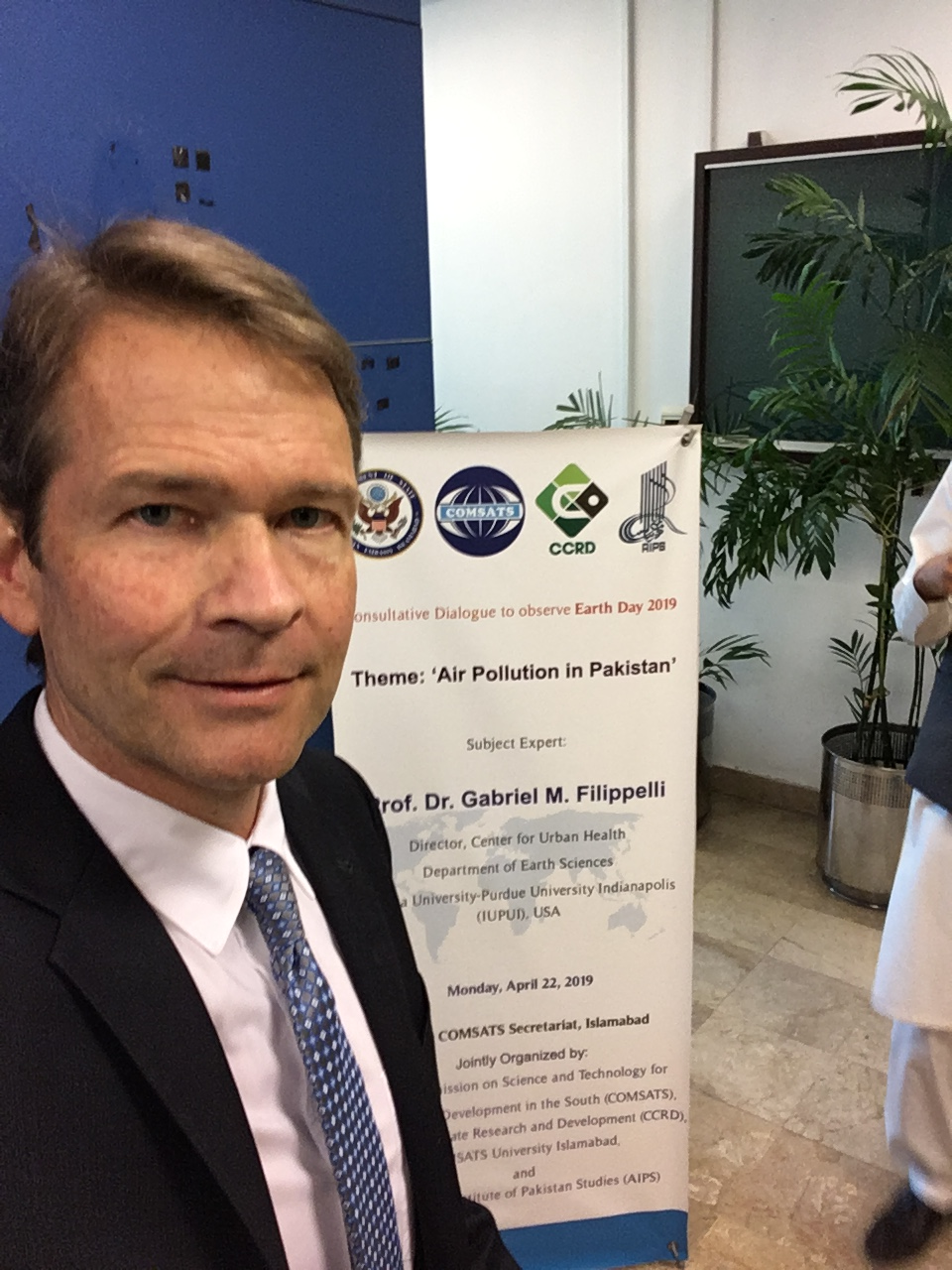
- Filippelli in 2019
- Education: University of California, Davis (BS); University of California, Santa Cruz (PhD)
- Scientific career
- Fields: Biogeochemistry
- Workplaces: Indiana University-Purdue University Indianapolis
- Thesis: Phosphorus geochemistry and accumulation rates in oceanic sediments during the Neogene (1994)
- Doctoral advisor: Margaret L. Delaney
- Website: science.iupui.edu/people-directory/people/filippelli-gabriel.html

Gabriel Filippelli is an American biogeochemist and professor of Earth sciences at Indiana University Indianapolis. In 2017 he began serving as the Editor in Chief of GeoHealth. Filippelli is the author of two books and many journal articles. He is the recipient of several awards and served as senior science advisor for the United States State Department from 2013–2014. His research addresses biogeochemical cycling in the environment, and the links between environmental processes and human health.

== Education ==
Filippelli was awarded a BS in geology from the University of California, Davis in 1986, a PhD in 1994 from the University of California, Santa Cruz, and then began working as an assistant professor of geology in 1994.

== Career ==
Filippelli is a Chancellor's Professor of Earth Sciences, the executive director of the Indiana University Environmental Resilience Institute and director of the Center for Urban Health at IUPUI.

Filippelli has been a member and chair of the United States Advisory Committee for Scientific Ocean Drilling and of the Science Planning Committee for the International Ocean Discovery Program. He has also written for a variety of major journals, including Nature, Science, and Geology, among others.

== Policy ==
Filippelli was senior science advisor for the United States State Department from 2013–2014, working in the area of ocean and polar science policy. In this capacity, he wrote policy related to climate change in the Antarctic, and was involved in the international effort to improve scientific cooperation through the Arctic nations, eventually leading to an international agreement on this issue

In 2015 he organized a letter addressed to then Indiana governor, Mike Pence, asking to be consulted for developing Indiana's climate change adaptation plans. Governor Pence did not respond.

Filippelli is an Air Quality Fellow for the US State Department and consults with embassies and universities in Pakistan on air quality science.

== Research ==
Filippelli is known for his work on various aspects of global nutrient cycling, including evolution of the Antarctic Circumpolar Current, terrestrial signals of cycling and landscape development, and future projections of nutrient resources to feed humanity. His recent work has focused on environmental health, marked by contributions in multiple journals on environmental exposures to contaminants and climate change.

He is the author of Climate Change and Life and a co-editor of Climate Change and Resilience in Indiana and Beyond.

== Academic roles ==
Filippelli is a 2015 Fellow of the International Association of GeoChemistry, the winner of the Charles Bantz Fellowship for Community Engagement, the author of about 100 peer-reviewed publications, a blogger, and community activist in the areas of community-engaged research and environmental justice. In August 2017, Filippelli became the Editor in Chief of GeoHealth, an American Geophysical Union journal. The journal's founding editor was Rita R. Colwell.

== Awards ==
- Fulbright Distinguished Chair (2022), University of Newcastle, Australia
- F. Earl Ingerson Lecturer (2021), Geochemical Society
- John W. Ryan Award for Distinguished Contributions to International Programs and Studies, Indiana University (2020)
- Chancellor's Professor, IUPUI (2020)
- Prose Award for Excellence in Physical Science and Mathematics, Association of American Publishers (2019)
- Fellow, International Association of GeoChemistry (2015)
