= George Hitchcock (poet) =

American writer

George Parks Hitchcock (June 2, 1914 – August 27, 2010) was an American actor, poet, playwright, teacher, labor activist, publisher, and painter. He is best known for creating Kayak, a poetry magazine that he published as a one-man operation from 1964 to 1984. Equally important, Hitchcock published writers under the "Kayak" imprint including the first two books by Charles Simic, second books by Philip Levine and Raymond Carver, translations by W.S. Merwin, and early books by Robert Bly and James Tate.

== Biography ==
Hitchcock was born in Hood River, Oregon, graduating in 1935 from the University of Oregon, where he was a reporter on the school newspaper. After college, he worked as a journalist for several labor movement periodicals, including The Western Worker and The People’s Daily World, simultaneously developing an interest in poetry which was fostered by Kenneth Rexroth. He joined the United States Merchant Marine during World War II, and worked as a cook and a waiter in the South Pacific.

After the war, he became more active in the labor movement, working to organize dairy workers in California and teaching at the California Labor School. Later, he became active in the San Francisco theater scene, writing plays and acting with the Actor's Workshop and the Interplayers while working as a landscape gardener.

While performing at the Oregon Shakespeare Festival in 1957, Hitchcock was called to testify before the House Un-American Activities Committee, where in response to a question asking him his profession, he responded, "I am a gardener. I do underground work on plants". He refused to answer any further questions "on the grounds that this hearing is a big bore and waste of the public's money".

== Magazine publisher ==
In 1958, after the San Francisco Review published one of Hitchcock's plays, he joined it as an editor. When the organization folded, he founded Kayak as a response to what he saw as the "tepid eclecticism" of the other literary journals of the day, with the journal's title representing the "small watertight vessel operated by a single oarsman" that was a metaphor for the way he personally ran the publication as a self-titled "dictator". Hitchcock ran Kayak frugally as a one-man show from its creation in 1964, using an offset printing press he had purchased and having personally "designed the magazine, edited it, printed it, illustrated it" and ran parties where the printed sheets would be assembled for mailing.

During his Kayak period in San Francisco, ca. 1967, he was on the adjunct faculty of San Francisco State and taught a lively graduate level playwriting course out of his home on Webster Street—three hours in the evening once a week—where students effectively performed scenes they had written for assignments; often visiting poets like Robert Bly and other Kayak writers dropped in for a cup of coffee and observed quietly from the kitchen.

Hitchcock moved to Santa Cruz, California in 1970 and joined the faculty of the University of California, Santa Cruz, where he taught poetry and playwriting until 1989 where he mentored and befriended poets Mark Jarman and Robert McDowell, among others, and the actress and author, Patricia McDowell. In the magazine's 64 issues published before he shut the publication in 1984, Kayak included many significant poets and writers of prose, such as Raymond Carver, Anne Sexton, Robert Bly, and Margaret Atwood. Howard Junker, founder and editor of Zyzzyva: The Journal of West Coast Writers and Artists, called Hitchcock "the pre-eminent maverick independent magazine publisher".

Hitchcock had co-written a critical satire Pioneers of Modern Poetry with poet Robert Peters in 1966. It was led to be an experiment in criticism. In these pieces where Hitchcock arranged most of the "poems" from various prose texts, and Peters wrote most of the "interpretations." These ripostes between Hitchcock & Peters were thrust against some of the excesses of Projective Verse poets, their adulators, and academic readings of poems.

== Legacy ==
Hitchcock died at age 96 on August 27, 2010, at his home in Eugene, Oregon. He was survived by his companion, Marjorie Simon, as well as by a son, two grandchildren and a great-grandchild.

A Tribute to George Hitchcock was published in ViVACE 2 Literary Magazine in 2010. Included in the tribute were quirky vignettes by Hitchcock's fellow poets, colleagues, friends and former students. ViVACE was founded by one of Hitchcock's former UCSC students Christine Neilson in 2009.
