= Battle of Mainzer Straße =

1990 riots in East Berlin

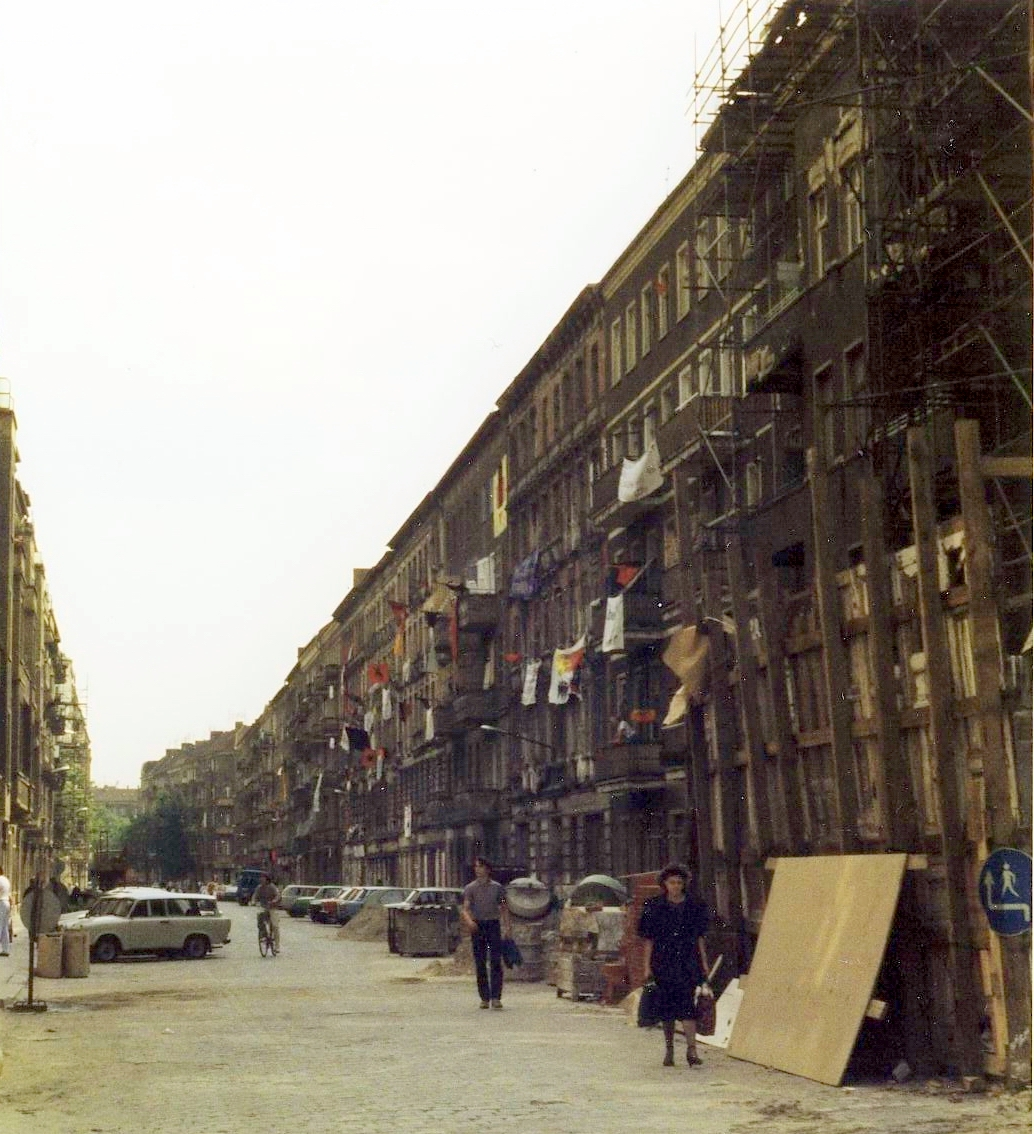
- Mainzer Straße in June 1990
- Date: 12–14 November 1990
- Location: Mainzer Straße, Friedrichshain, Berlin
- Caused by: Eviction
- Methods: Rioting, protests, barricades
- Result: Police victory

Parties
| Squatters, autonomous movement | Magistrate of East Berlin, police |

Number
| Over 1,000 | Over 3,000 |

Casualties
- Deaths: 0
- Injuries: Over 160
- Arrested: 417

The battle of Mainzer Straße took place in Friedrichshain, East Berlin between 12 and 14 November 1990. It was a major incident in the history of the city, following the fall of the Berlin Wall in 1989. The magistrate of East Berlin decided to evict a row of squatted apartment blocks and the autonomous movement resisted the eviction for three days, until the buildings were all evicted by the police. One person was wounded by a ricochet and 417 people were arrested in an operation of over 3,000 officers. Following the riots, the magistrate decided to concentrate on legalizing squats in Berlin.

== Occupation ==
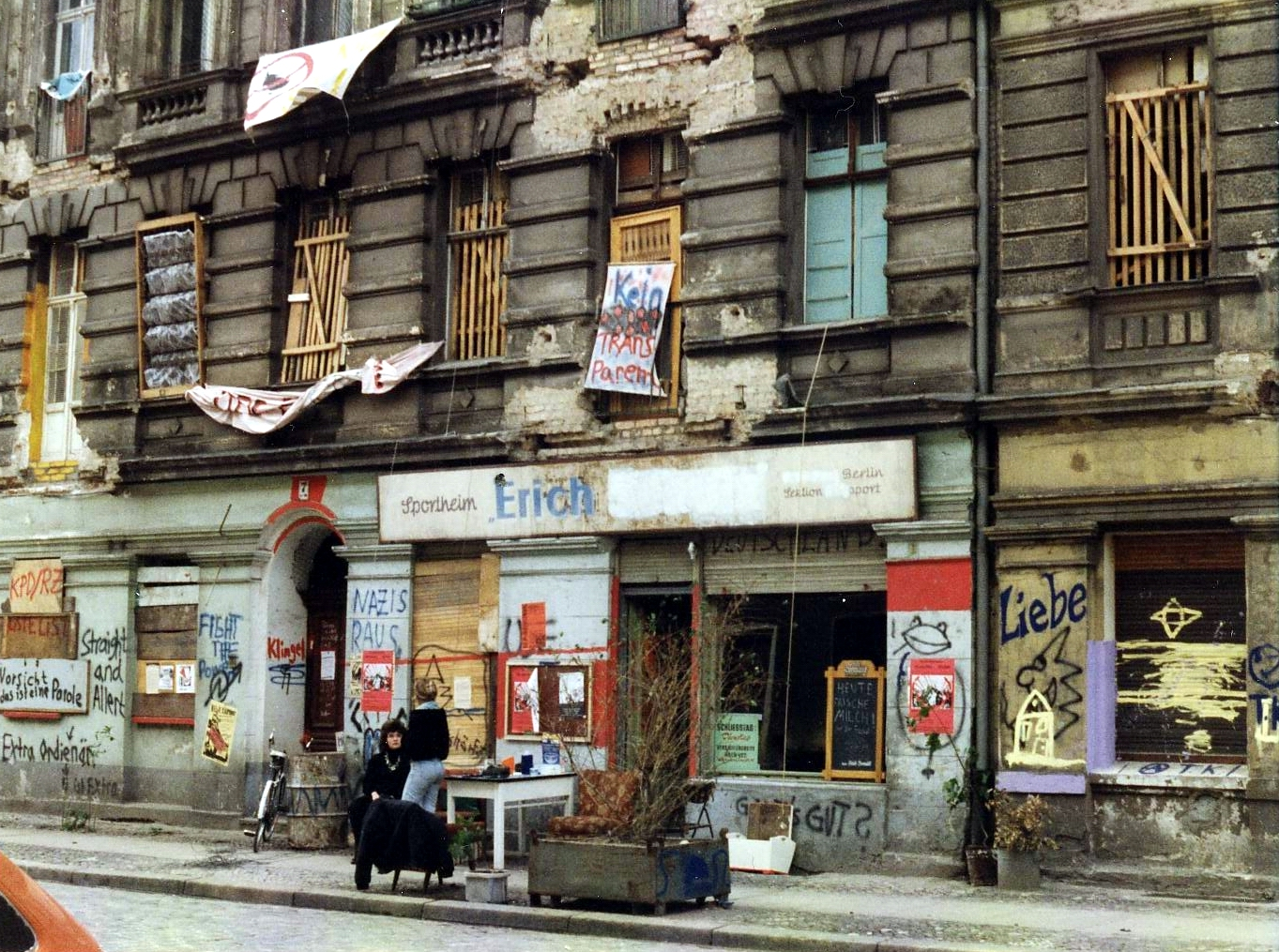
Mainzer Straße 7 in June 1990

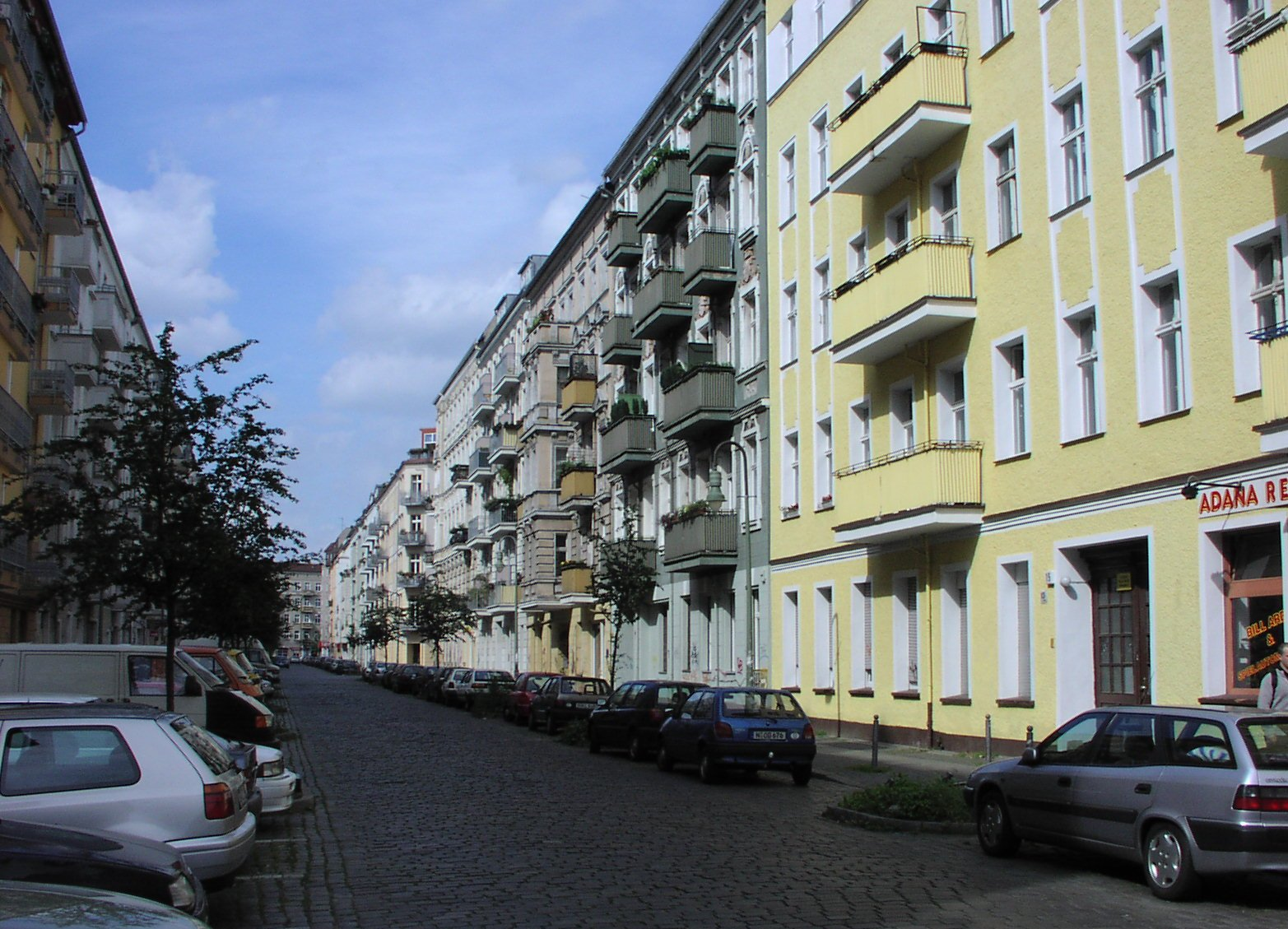
Mainzer Straße in 2002

In the 1980s, the run-down buildings on Mainzer Straße in Friedrichshain were scheduled for demolition and by 1989 the residents had been decanted. However, the fall of the Berlin Wall in November 1989 put the demolition plans on hold. The apartments at 2–11 Mainzer Straße were squatted in May 1990.

Soon there were about 250 squatters living on the street. House number 4 was occupied by gays and queers. Number 5 hosted an infoshop, number 6 was a pub and there was a community cafe at 7 and 9. The squatters were mainly from West Berlin and connected to the left-wing autonomous movement. In this time frame, there were over 130 squatted buildings in East Berlin.

The squatter council attempted to negotiate with the magistrate of East Berlin in order to legalize the squats, but the magistrate had decided as of July 1990 to start its own version of West Berlin's Berliner Linie. This meant new squats would not be permitted. Knowing that the eviction was approaching, the squatters barricaded the street.

== Battle ==
On 12 November 1990, the police tried to evict the buildings at 2–11 Mainzer Straße, having already evicted squats at Pfarrstraße and Corneliusstraße in Lichtenberg, but were repelled by around a thousand people. After negotiations failed, the squats were finally evicted two days later on 14 November 1990 by over 3,000 German police officers from three federal states. The squatters had erected barricades and fought the eviction by throwing projectiles including molotov cocktails. The police used stun grenades, tanks, water cannon and live ammunition. One person was wounded in the foot by a ricochet and at least 160 people were injured. In the end 417 people were arrested.

The events became known as the "battle of Mainzer Straße" and it was the largest civil conflict since the East German uprising of 1953. Several members of the ruling Alternative Liste (Green) party joined the protests in solidarity with the squatters, since the decision to evict contravened the law of the East Germany. They were arrested and released without charge. The Governing Mayor of Berlin, Walter Momper, said "whoever shows solidarity with them [squatters], shows solidarity for the wrong people" and Berlin's interior minister, Erich Paetzold, commented that the rioters had shown "unbelievable brutality".

== Legacy ==
Following the eviction, there was a dispute between the ruling coalition of Alternative Liste (Greens) and Social Democrats over police violence at the eviction and the Greens quit. The magistrate then decided to pursue more vigorously the process of legalization for other squatted projects. The squatters movement was also more inclined towards negotiation as a means to reach secure housing.

Between 1971 and 2012, around 500 houses were occupied in Berlin and around 200 were legalized. West Berlin's longest running house without a contract (Marchstrasse) was evicted in 1996.
