= Don Lane (Santa Cruz) =

American community organizer

Mayor, City of Santa Cruz
- In office December 2014 – December 2015

Mayor, City of Santa Cruz
- In office December 2011 – December 2012

Mayor, City of Santa Cruz
- In office December 1991 – December 1992

Personal details
- Education: University of California, Santa Cruz
- Occupation: community organizer, university instructor, former elected official, former nonprofit organization administrator
- Website: www.donlane.org

Don Lane is an American community organizer, university instructor, former elected official, and former nonprofit organization administrator in Santa Cruz, California. Lane spent many years working and managing the Saturn Cafe after graduating from the University of California, Santa Cruz in 1978. While operating the Saturn Cafe, Lane served the community in multiple capacities in the City of Santa Cruz and community groups; leading to his serving as Santa Cruz Mayor in 1992 and again in 2012 and 2015.

== Early life and education ==
In 1973, Lane arrived in Santa Cruz, California at the age of 17, to study politics and history at the University of California, Santa Cruz.

== Political career ==
Getting his start in politics, he staffed the Santa Cruz area election campaign of soon-to-be elected Congressman Leon Panetta in 1976 and again after graduating in 1978.

Searching for a way to remain in Santa Cruz, he started the Saturn Café and built the restaurant into a local staple and cultural phenomenon. Once the Saturn Café was on steady footing, Lane returned to community politics, serving on the City Water Commission and the City Public Works Commission. He was also active in the local Democratic Party, serving as chair of the Santa Cruz County Democratic Party and as president of a local Democratic Club.

In 1988, while still managing the Saturn Café, Lane was elected to the Santa Cruz City Council. During his term, the 1989 Loma Prieta earthquake devastated Downtown Santa Cruz. Much of his tenure was focused on working with other city officials and community members on the successful downtown rebuilding effort. He also focused on a few affordable housing projects and improving the city’s homeless services. His first term was not without turmoil. In a Santa Cruz Sentinel article he said that during his term there was "inadequate, vacuous and often unfair press coverage, outright meanness and hatred aimed at me from various quarters."

After completing a term as mayor of Santa Cruz in 1992, Lane took a hiatus from the council. He turned his attention to new projects. First he sold his majority ownership of the Saturn Café, and then worked as a campaign coordinator for Representative Sam Farr. He also played a key role in founding the Homeless Community Resource Center, which is now Housing Matters. In 1996, he co-founded and directed an organization called Youth Opportunities, a job training program for disadvantaged teens.

In 2008 Lane decided to run for Santa Cruz City Council again. He won a seat on the Council in 2008 and received enough votes to become mayor in 2012. He ran for reelection in 2012 and again won enough votes to serve a term as mayor—in 2015. During this term he served on the Economic Development Council, Santa Cruz Metropolitan Transit District Board of Directors and the Santa Cruz County Regional Transportation Commission (SCCRTC). He also co-chaired the successful campaign in favor of Measure D, to improve transportation infrastructure and alternative transportation programs in Santa Cruz County. And he championed the effort to bring the Santa Cruz Warriors basketball team to the Santa Cruz Community.

After completing his term, he co-chaired the campaign for Measure H, an affordable housing funding measure for Santa Cruz County. The measure achieved majority support from voters but did not achieve the two-thirds majority required for passage.

In 2012, Lane and other community leaders launched Smart Solutions to Homelessness, an education and advocacy organization designed to promote long term solutions to the challenges of homelessness in Santa Cruz County. The organization terminated its activities in 2019, with the formation of the Housing for Health Partnership, which embodied many of the Smart Solutions principles.

Lane serves on the governing boards of Housing Santa Cruz County and Housing Matters (formerly the Homeless Services Center). From time to time, Lane is an instructor in public policy issues at UC Santa Cruz.

== Personal life ==
Lane lives with his wife Mary Howe, a retired UCSC electronics technician, who leads the Village Santa Cruz organization. His daughter is Tida Lane-Howe.
