= Concordia Summit =

Annual global affairs summit

Concordia
- Founded: 2011
- Founders: Matthew A. Swift & Nicholas M. Logothetis
- Location: New York City
- Website: www.concordia.net

Concordia is a registered 501(c)(3) nonprofit organization. It is best known for its Annual Summit in New York City, which is a global affairs forums that promotes partnering between governments, businesses, and nonprofits to address the world's most pressing needs.

== Founding ==
Concordia was founded in 2011 by Matthew Swift and Nicholas Logothetis. They had been best friends since high school, where they were business partners in a successful food purveyor enterprise. Both attended university in Washington, D.C., and both had a background in journalism, media, politics, and international affairs. Noting the effectiveness of the formats of the Wall Street Journal CEO Council and the Clinton Global Initiative, they founded Concordia as a nonprofit organization that helps develop public-private partnerships (P3s), in the belief that the most effective and sustainable way to find solutions to pressing global issues is through cooperation between the public, private, and nonprofit sectors.

In light of the 10th anniversary of 9/11, Swift and Logothetis formulated their first concept as "Building Partnerships Against Extremism", and focused the first Concordia Summit, in September 2011, on combating the root causes of extremism – failing states, poverty, and lack of education – through dialogue and partnering between businesses, governments, and NGOs.

Concordia continues to convene a large annual summit each fall in New York City during the week of the United Nations General Assembly, as a gathering place for world leaders, business leaders, innovators, and nonprofit personnel to discuss and foster cross-sector partnership to address the world's most pressing problems. Along with these annual summits and additional regional summits, its year-round activities include events programming in diverse areas, targeted social-impact campaigns, and research into public-private partnerships.

== Activities ==
=== Events programming, campaigns, and research ===
Concordia engages year-round in activities including programming, research, and campaigns. Its ongoing events programming, in which it partners with members, advisors, and other organizations to achieve meaningful solutions, encompasses areas including:

- diplomacy and defense
- economic development and international finance
- education and workforce development
- environmental security and natural resource management
- gender parity and inclusive diversity
- global health and emergency response
- good governance and democracy
- human rights and civil liberties
- innovative technology and sustainable infrastructure
- shared value and social impact

Concordia also engages in focused longterm social-impact campaigns, in areas that include ensuring sustainable food supply, and combating labor trafficking. The campaigns bring together public-sector partners, corporate partners, NGO partners, and academic partners, to raise awareness, generate research, and provide meaningful and sustainable social impact.

The organization also produces and contributes to research projects related to campaigns and other endeavors. These include the Concordia Partnership Index, a series of online dashboards and research papers to equip governments, businesses, and nonprofit organizations with analytical tools to effectively evaluate global partnership environments; it ranks countries based on their readiness and need to engage in public-private partnerships, and includes indicators based on need.

=== Summits ===
==== 2011–2015 ====
Concordia held its inaugural summit in New York City in September 2011. The focus of the summit was the global fight against terrorism, and international efforts to counter the breeding of extremist thought. George W. Bush was the keynote speaker. The event gathered world leaders, diplomats, and business leaders, and provided a platform for dialogue between private and public entities to create partnerships in combating the root causes of extremism. Afterwards, Concordia posted details of three key findings that emerged from the summit concerning combating terrorism and the role of public-private partnerships in doing so.

The 2012 Concordia Summit addressed five key topics: global security, the economy, education, environmental sustainability, and health around the world. Bill Clinton was the keynote speaker of the summit, which convened former and current heads of state, business executives, and nonprofit leaders devoted to promoting public-private partnerships.

The 2013 summit focused on the global issue of youth unemployment. Key participants included corporate executives, international heads of state, public-policy and business scholars, nonprofit leaders, diplomats, journalists, and members of the Obama administration. At the summit, Concordia also released its first Index Report, a composite rating tool covering 17 emerging and growing markets, with case studies into key regions, measuring the readiness and need of a country to engage in public-private partnership activities for positive social and economic impact.

The 2014 Concordia Summit, titled "Scaling Proven Solutions Through Collaboration", focused on how collaboration between the public, private, and nonprofit sectors can facilitate large-scale impact by leveraging each sector's unique expertise. The summit, which convened more than 700 former and current heads of state, business executives, and nonprofit leaders, explored the role of public-private partnerships in creating positive social and economic impact in a variety of areas. Subjects discussed included human trafficking, and the partnerships the military engages in to aid communities around the world. Featured speakers during the summit included Senator Amy Klobuchar, Senator John McCain, Dr. Mehmet Oz, New York District Attorney Cyrus R. Vance, Jr., and Vice Chairman of the Joint Chiefs of Staff James A. Winnefeld Jr.

Concordia's fifth annual summit, held in October 2015, convened hundreds of thought leaders, heads of state, dignitaries, business leaders, and nonprofit/NGO representatives. Yahoo! Finance and Yahoo! News filmed and livestreamed the conference online for the first time. The topics discussed included labor trafficking, youth unemployment, transportation infrastructure, global food security, corporate responsibility, and democracy in Latin America. Vice President Joe Biden spoke on political and social issues including corruption, sustainable development, climate change, and America's middle class, and Secretary of State John Kerry spoke in praise of public-private partnerships and on behalf of the State Department's Office of Global Partnerships, noting efforts on several political and material fronts including climate change, the Trans-Pacific Partnership, and anti-terrorism.

==== 2016–present ====
2026 Summit

At the 2016 Concordia Summit, a major topic was the global refugee and migrant crisis. The future of Europe and the European Union (EU) was also discussed, and George Soros was a key speaker on both the EU and the refugee crisis. Warren Buffett spoke about The Giving Pledge and his decision to give half his wealth to philanthropy. Additional discussions covered global healthcare provision, as well as women's health, maternity issues, women's empowerment, and gender equality. Cybersecurity and intellectual property were discussed, and the CEO of Cambridge Analytica spoke on big data, data analytics, and electoral psychographics. The U.S. State Department and Bretton Woods II introduced the Trillion Dollar Challenge: A New Business Model for Investing in Social Impact and Development, intended to help achieve the UN's 17 Sustainable Development Goals (SDGs) by 2030, and the United States Council for International Business discussed the role of private businesses in achieving SDGs. A panel called "The New MBA: Business, Partnerships and Tackling Global Challenges" explored MBA programs which emphasize diversity, innovation, sustainability, internationalism, and partnerships. Additional topics included global food supply, waste disposal, human rights and democracy, forced labor and trafficking, and international trade policy. The international political relations of countries such as Cuba and Cyprus were also addressed.

In addition to its annual summits in New York, Concordia introduced Regional Summits beginning in 2016. The first Concordia Americas Summit was held in May 2016 in Miami, Florida. The summit gathered more than 100 world leaders from public, private, and nonprofit sectors to address pressing political and economic issues affecting the Americas, including energy, trade, governance, regional security, democracy, and corruption. One key topic was the Venezuelan crisis, which was discussed by a panel which included Luis Almagro and Lilian Tintori, and in other group discussions which included a variety of Latin American political and business leaders and other experts. A second Concordia Americas Summit was held February 2017 in Bogotá, Colombia. Corruption and accountability, achieving peace, regional investment, and sustainability were among its focuses. Former Colombian Presidents Álvaro Uribe and Andrés Pastrana, as well as business leaders and military leaders, critiqued the current status of the Colombian peace process between the Colombian government and the FARC, and current president Juan Manuel Santos gave the summit's closing remarks.

The first Concordia Europe Summit was held in June 2017 in Athens, Greece. Topics under discussion included the refugee crisis, the UN's Sustainable Development Goals (SDGs), regional security, Brexit, and the future of the European Union. Former U.S. Vice President Joe Biden spoke on a variety of topics, including European unity; Russian malfeasance; the refugee crisis; prosperity, security, democracy, and the transatlantic alliance; and global warming. The stability and economic recovery of Greece, and its membership in the EU and the eurozone, were also major subjects of discussion during the summit.

The 2017 Concordia Annual Summit was held in New York City in September 2017. The 2018 summit was also held in New York City, alongside the United Nations General Assembly in September 2018.

=== Additional activities ===
Concordia operates on other fronts in addition to its summits, events programming, campaigns, and research. It has co-partnered with the Secretary of State's Office of Global Partnerships in Global Partnerships Week each year since its inception in 2014. The forum emphasizes the critical role that public-private partnerships play in diplomacy and development work around the world.

In 2014 Concordia, in conjunction with the University of Virginia Darden School of Business Institute for Business in Society, and the U.S. Department of State Secretary's Office of Global Partnerships, established the annual P3 Impact Award to recognize and honor best examples of public-private partnerships (P3s) that are improving communities and the world in the most impactful ways. The competition also provides thought leadership, generates a database of information, and promotes best practices relevant to public-private partnerships. The inaugural P3 Impact Award was presented at the 2014 Concordia Summit to CocoaLink, a public-private partnership between The Hershey Company, the Ghana Cocoa Board, and the World Cocoa Foundation which uses mobile technology to improve cocoa production and the livelihoods of African cocoa farmers. The 2015 award went to the TV White Space Partnership, a partnership between the United States Agency for International Development (USAID), Ecosystems Improved for Sustainable Fisheries (ECOFISH), the Government of the Philippines, and Microsoft which utilizes unused TV frequencies to send out free internet signals to more than 200,000 individuals in isolated locations. The 2016 award was given to Project Nurture, a partnership between TechnoServe, the Bill & Melinda Gates Foundation, and The Coca-Cola Company which connects mango and passion-fruit farmers in Kenya and Uganda to better markets, including the local Coca-Cola supply chain.

Concordia also presents the Concordia Leadership Award, which recognises global leaders within the public, private, and nonprofit sectors who inspire others through their ability to turn vision into impact. Recipients have included Muhammad Yunus, the Nobel Peace Prize winner who pioneered microfinance and microcredit; Paul Polman, CEO of Unilever, for his active commitment to sustainable practices; and Gloria Malone, creator of Teen Mom NYC.

The 2021 Leadership Awards were given to former U.S. First Lady Laura Bush, the LEGO Group CEO Niels B. Christiansen, and Justice for Migrant Women founder and president Mónica Ramírez.

== Leadership ==
Concordia was co-founded by Matthew A. Swift and Nicholas M. Logothetis. Swift is the organization's chairman and CEO, and Logothetis is its chairman of the board.

Swift and Logothetis had been friends and business partners at Salisbury School, a boarding school in Connecticut, where they ran a highly successful business selling after-school snacks. Swift attended Georgetown University, and Logothetis attended the Elliott School of International Affairs at George Washington University. Both Swift and Logothetis spent several years working for subsidiaries of News Corporation, and both have a background in journalism, media, politics, and international affairs.

Concordia has a staff, a board of directors, a Leadership Council, and a group of advisors. George Logothetis, chairman and CEO of the Libra Group, is chairman of Concordia's Leadership Council.

As of 2021, Concordia's Leadership Council consists of:

- Luis Almagro, secretary general of the Organization of American States
- Prince Abdulaziz bin Talal, chairman of GSP Group
- William Antholis, director and CEO of the Miller Center
- Teri Ardleigh, co-founder of Xcovery Vision
- José María Aznar Lopez, former prime minister of Spain
- Manuel Barroso, former prime minister of Portugal and president of the European Commission
- Cherie Blair, founder and chair of Omnia Strategy LLP, founder of the Cherie Blair Foundation for Women
- Irina Bokova, director-general of UNESCO
- Ian Bremmer, founder and president of Eurasia Group; Foreign Affairs Columnist and Editor-at-Large at Time
- Nancy Brinker, former US Ambassador to Hungary, founder of Susan G Komen
- Felipe Calderón Hinojosa, former president of Mexico
- Carmen Castillo, president and CEO of SDI International
- Laura Chinchilla, former president of Costa Rica
- Paula Dobriansky, former Under Secretary of State for Democracy and Global Affairs; former United States Special Envoy for Northern Ireland
- Mikuláš Dzurinda, former prime minister of Slovakia
- Jacob A. Frenkel, chairman of JPMorgan Chase International
- Monica Geingos, former First Lady of the Republic of Namibia
- Jane Harman, director, president, and CEO of the Woodrow Wilson International Center for Scholars
- Dr Michael Hastings, chancellor of Regent's University London
- Kerry Healey, president of Milken Institute's Center for Advancing the American Dream
- Jeh Johnson, former United States Secretary of Homeland Security
- Muhtar Kent, chairman and former CEO of The Coca-Cola Company
- John S. Koudounis, CEO of Calamos Investments
- Aleksander Kwaśniewski, former president of Poland
- Luis Alberto Lacalle, former president of Uruguay
- Suwat Liptapanlop, former deputy prime minister of Thailand
- Andrew N. Liveris, president, chairman, and CEO of Dow Chemical Company
- Constantine M. Logothetis, executive vice chairman of Libra Group
- George Logothetis, chairman and CEO of the Libra Group
- Jabulane Mabuza, chairman of Telkom SA SOC Limited
- Anita B. McBride, former assistant to President George W. Bush, chief of staff to First Lady Laura Bush
- Carolyn Miles, president and CEO of Save the Children
- George J. Mitchell, former United States Senate Majority Leader
- Nate Morris, founder and CEO Rubicon Technologies
- Dikembe Mutombo, chairman and president of the Dikembe Mutombo Foundation
- John Negroponte, former U.S. Deputy Secretary of State and U.S. Director of National Intelligence
- Petra Nemcova, co-founder of All Hands and Hearts
- Michael J. Nyenhuis, president and CEO of UNICEF USA
- Olusegun Obasanjo, former president of Nigeria
- Eduardo J. Padrón, president of Miami Dade College
- Andrés Pastrana Arango, former president of Colombia
- David Petraeus, former director of the Central Intelligence Agency
- Sebastián Piñera, former president of Chile
- Jorge Fernando Quiroga, former president of Bolivia
- Anders Fogh Rasmussen, former secretary-general of NATO
- Kevin Rudd, former prime minister of Australia
- Toyin Saraki, founder-president of The Wellbeing Foundation Africa
- Janti Soeripto, president and chief executive officer of Save the Children
- Petar Stoyanov, former president of Bulgaria
- Gillian Tett, US editor-at-large of the Financial Times
- Frances Townsend, former Homeland Security Advisor to the president of the United States; Senior National Security Analyst at CBS News
- Danilo Türk, former president of the Republic of Slovenia
- Álvaro Uribe Velez, former president of Colombia
- Marianna V. Vardinoyannis, goodwill ambassador for UNESCO
- Vaira Vīķe-Freiberga, former president of Latvia.
