= Arab Open University =

Non-profit university in the Arab world

- الجامعة العربية المفتوحة
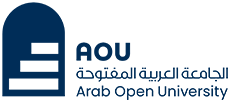
- Other names: AOU
- Motto: Towards a promising future
- Type: Non-profit university
- Established: December 2000; 25 years ago
- Founders: Talal bin Abdulaziz Al Saud
- Academic affiliations: Open University
- Budget: $144,091,194 (2024)
- Chairman: Abdulaziz bin Talal Al Saud
- President: Mohammed bin Ibrahim Al-Zakri
- Vice-president: Naif Almutairi, Omar Al-Jarrah
- Total staff: 1031
- Students: 62,612
- Undergraduates: 61,886
- Postgraduates: 742
- Location: Ardiya, Kuwait (Headquarters); 29°16′56.6″N 47°54′46.4″E
- Colors: Blue and White
- Website: Headquarters

Arab Open University (AOU) (Arabic: الجامعة العربية المفتوحة) is a non-profit university system in the Arab world. Headquartered in Kuwait, the system is composed of 16 campuses across 9 countries: Ardiya in Kuwait, Riyadh, Jeddah, Dammam, Madinah, Ḥail, Al-Ahsa in Saudi Arabia, Seeb in Oman, A'ali in Bahrain, Amman in Jordan, Al-Bireh in Palestine, Beirut, Antelias, Tripoli in Lebanon, El-Shorouk in Egypt and Khartoum in Sudan.

The university has a combined student body of 62,612 students, 61,886 of which are postgraduates while 742 of which are postgraduates, 1031 staff members and 77,037 living alumni.

The headquarters of the university is located in Kuwait, designated in 2000. The university has a long-standing academic partnership with the United Kingdom's Open University.

== History ==
Talal bin Abdulaziz Al Saud founded the university in December 2000. Kuwait was chosen to be the headquarters for the university. At that same time, 6 branches were established in Kuwait, Bahrain, Egypt, Jordan, Lebanon and Saudi Arabia.

Teaching commenced in early October 2002 in Kuwait, Jordan and Lebanon while Bahrain, Saudi Arabia and Egypt started in the fall semester of 2002-2003.

Subsequent branches were established afterwards. A branch was opened in Oman in September 2007, in Sudan in September 2013, and in Palestine in 2017. The university also intends to open branches in Yemen, Syria and Mauritania.

== Academics ==
=== Academic programs ===
AOU offers undergraduate and postgraduate programs in fields including business administration, information technology and computing, English language and literature, graphic and multimedia design, media, education and law. The university follows an open-learning model intended to widen access to higher education for learners across the Arab world. Through its partnership with the Open University in the United Kingdom, AOU collaborates on higher-education programs taught in English.

== Organization and administration ==
The university operates under the chairmanship of Abdulaziz bin Talal Al Saud and the presidency of Mohammed bin Ibrahim Al-Zakri.

== Branches ==
University	City	Students	Staff	Website
Kuwait
Arab Open University, Kuwait	Ardiya	11474	215	https://www.aou.edu.kw/
Saudi Arabia
Arab Open University, Riyadh	Riyadh	28933	275	https://www.arabou.edu.sa/
Arab Open University, Jeddah	Jeddah	28933	275	https://www.arabou.edu.sa/
Arab Open University, Dammam	Dammam	28933	275	https://www.arabou.edu.sa/
Arab Open University, Al-Madinah	Madinah	28933	275	https://www.arabou.edu.sa/
Arab Open University, Hail	Ḥail	28933	275	https://www.arabou.edu.sa/
Arab Open University, Al-Ahsa	Al-Ahsa	28933	275	https://www.arabou.edu.sa/
Oman
Arab Open University, Oman	Seeb	3407	111	https://www.aou.edu.om/
Bahrain
Arab Open University, Bahrain	A'ali	2738	64	https://www.aou.org.bh/
Jordan
Arab Open University, Jordan	Amman	2385	90	https://www.aou.edu.jo/
Palestine
Arab Open University, Palestine	Al-Bireh	6		https://www.aou.edu.ps/
Lebanon
Arab Open University, Beirut	Beirut	2524	136	https://web.aou.edu.lb/
Arab Open University, Antelias	Antelias	2524	136	https://web.aou.edu.lb/
Arab Open University, Tripoli	Tripoli	2524	136	https://web.aou.edu.lb/
Egypt
Arab Open University, Egypt	El Shorouk	10907	133	https://www.aou.edu.eg/
Sudan
Arab Open University, Sudan	Khartoum	5	7	https://www.aou.edu.sd/

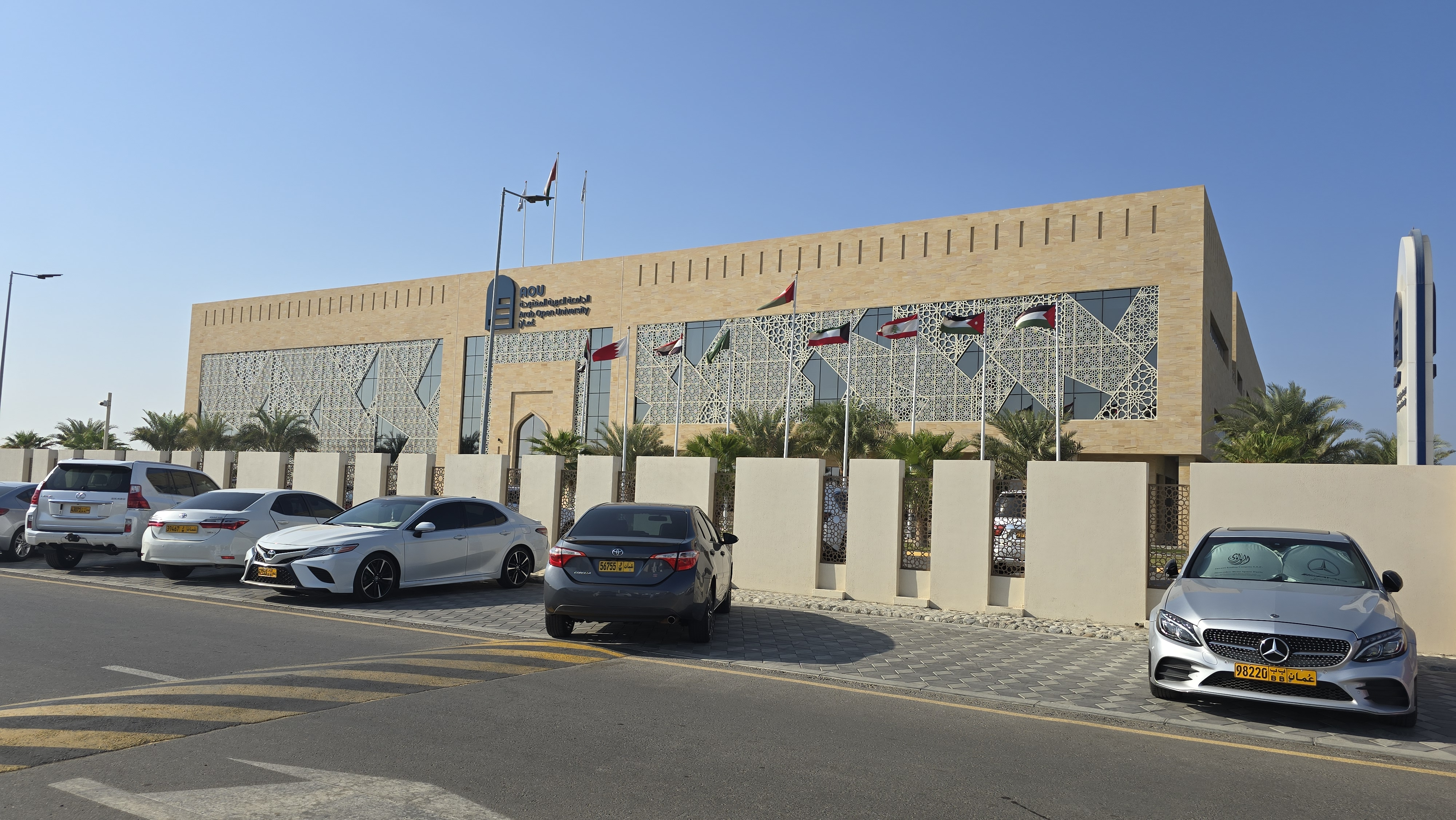
The campus for Arab Open University, Oman

== Faculties ==
Faculty	Students	Website
Faculty of Business Studies	30025	Headquarters, Kuwait, Saudi Arabia, Oman, Bahrain, Jordan, Palestine, Lebanon, Egypt, Sudan
Faculty of Computer Studies	22137	Headquarters, Kuwait, Saudi Arabia, Oman, Bahrain, Jordan, Palestine, Lebanon, Egypt, Sudan
Faculty of Education	5543	Headquarters, Oman, Jordan, Lebanon, Egypt
Faculty of Language Studies	1029	Headquarters, Kuwait, Saudi Arabia, Oman, Bahrain, Jordan, Palestine, Lebanon, Egypt, Sudan
Faculty of Law	1606	Headquarters, Oman
Faculty of Media	2288	Headquarters, Jordan, Egypt

== See also ==
- List of universities in Kuwait
- List of universities and colleges in Saudi Arabia
- List of universities and colleges in Oman
- List of universities in Bahrain
