= Matthew Swift =

American entrepreneur (born 1986)

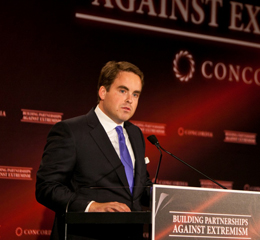
- Swift at the Concordia Summit, 2012
- Born: Matthew Ardleigh Swift; August 28, 1986 (age 39); Charlottesville, Virginia, U.S.
- Education: Georgetown University (B.A.)

Matthew Ardleigh Swift (born August 28, 1986) is an American entrepreneur and nonprofit executive. He is the co-founder, Chairman, and CEO of the Concordia Summit, a nonprofit nonpartisan organization that promotes public-private partnerships between business, government, and nonprofit organizations to address the world's most pressing problems.

== Early life and education ==
Swift was born and raised in Charlottesville, Virginia. His mother is Teri Ardleigh Swift, the co-founder of Xcovery Vision.

He went to high school at Salisbury School, an all-boys boarding school in Salisbury, Connecticut, through 2006. He attended Georgetown University, graduating in 2010 with a B.A. in Government and National Security Studies.

== Career ==
=== Early career ===
In 2004, while at Salisbury School, an all-boys boarding school in Connecticut, Swift started an after-school snack business on campus with his best friend Nicholas Logothetis. The undertaking was successful, and they were given the restaurant concession in a new student center, renaming the business Sarum Snacks. The enterprise achieved revenues of $350,000 within two years of launching, and profits were donated to charities.

The two youths' entrepreneurial spirit caught the attention of Rupert Murdoch, and they were accepted for internships at Fox News; while there, they created and submitted a course for entrepreneurs at Salisbury School. Later, they worked at the New York Post, where they created a weekly insert targeting the 18- to 24-year-old demographic. Swift and Logothetis subsequently worked at British Sky Broadcasting in London, England, where they helped the media company reach out to Millennials. Swift and Logothetis also worked at News Corporation; while there, they created a two-year entrepreneurship education program for inner-city high school students in the South Bronx called Entrepreneur 360 (E360).

Swift's early career also included work for T. Boone Pickens and the Pickens Plan, an internship with Virginia Senator John Warner, and an internship with the Business Roundtable.

In 2011, he co-founded with Scott Caputo the political action committee Concord 51, aimed at bringing young professionals into the Republican party by encouraging politicians to focus exclusively on fiscal conservatism, energy advancement, and national defense rather than social issues which young voters found divisive.

=== Concordia Summit ===
In 2009, while a student at Georgetown University, Swift won charity auctions for lunch dates with former Polish President Aleksander Kwasniewski and former Spanish Prime Minister José María Aznar, who were both teaching at the university. Swift brought along his best friend and business partner Nicholas Logothetis, a student at George Washington University, and the two former world leaders subsequently became mentors to the two students.

Swift and Logothetis founded the Concordia Summit in February 2011. Noting the effectiveness of the formats of the Wall Street Journal CEO Council and the Clinton Global Initiative, they founded Concordia as a nonpartisan nonprofit organization that helps develop cross-sector collaboration and public-private partnerships (P3s), in the belief that the most effective and sustainable way to find solutions to pressing global issues is through cooperation between the public, private, and nonprofit sectors. Swift is the organization's Chairman and CEO. The duo's mentors Kwasniewski and Aznar became members of Concordia's Leadership Council, and helped attract former and current world leaders as speakers.

In light of the 10th anniversary of 9/11, Swift and Logothetis formulated their first concept as "Building Partnerships Against Extremism", and focused the first annual Concordia Summit, in September 2011, on combating the root causes of extremism – failing states, poverty, and lack of education – through dialogue and partnering between businesses, governments, and NGOs. George W. Bush was the keynote speaker, and additional speakers included former Colombian President Álvaro Uribe. The inaugural event gathered world leaders, diplomats, and business leaders, and provided a platform for dialogue between private and public entities to create partnerships to combat and prevent the causes of extremism.

Swift ensured that the organization remained "fiercely nonpartisan". Subsequent annual Concordia Summits addressed diverse global topics, and speakers have included Bill Clinton, John McCain, Joe Biden, Warren Buffett, and a variety of current and former international heads of state and business leaders. Swift and Logothetis also added year-round activities to nurture partnerships between the public and private sectors, including smaller monthly events, ongoing programming, longterm campaigns, and a research arm, including the Concordia Index which analyzes the feasibility of P3s across 17 countries.

By 2016 Concordia's annual budget had expanded to about $4 million, and it had reached nearly 2,500 participants each year at its annual summits in New York. The organization and the annual summit had also gained significant recognition, especially in light of the discontinuation of the Clinton Global Initiative after 2016. Also in 2016, in addition to Concordia's annual summit in New York City, Swift and Logothetis began instituting regional summits. These include the Concordia Americas Summit and the Concordia Europe Summit, which bring together public- and private-sector leaders to help resolve pressing political, economic, and social problems in Latin America and Europe respectively.

== Advisorships and memberships ==
In addition to being Chairman and CEO of the Concordia Summit, Swift is on the Board of Directors of the Seleni Institute, and a Junior Board Member of HealthCorps. He is an Advisory Council Member of the Millennium Leadership Program at the Atlantic Council, and a member of the Next Generation Leaders' Advisory Council at the McCain Institute for International Leadership. In 2012, he was selected as one of the inaugural New York Leaders in the Foreign Policy Initiative Leaders Program, and he is on the U.S. Department of State's Advisory Committee on Public-Private Partnerships (SAP3). He is on the Global Advisory Board of i2Co School of Transformational Leadership and is Business Advisor to the S.H.E. Summit. He is a member of the National Press Club Washington.

In 2013 Swift was chosen as one of Red Alert Politics's 30 under 30. In September 2016 he gave a TEDx talk at TEDxFulton Street on "How to Create Partnerships Between World Leaders".

== Personal life ==
Swift lives in New York City. He also spends time in Palm Beach, Florida, where his family resides.
