= George Logothetis =

English and American businessman (born 1975)

- Born: 18 January 1975 (age 51); London, United Kingdom
- Citizenship: British and American
- Occupation: Businessman
- Known for: Executive chairman of Libra Group and chairman of Libra Philanthropies
- Spouse: Nitzia Embiricos
- Children: 4
- Relatives: Nicholas Logothetis (brother)

George Michael Logothetis (Greek: Τζορτζ Μάικλ Λογοθέτης; born 18 January 1975) is a Greek-American businessman. He was born into a Greek shipping family. Logothetis grew up in London and has lived in New York City since 2004. He is a US citizen.

Logothetis is the executive chairman of Libra Group, a diversified international privately owned company that he founded in 2003. As of 2023, Libra Group owns and operates 15 subsidiary companies around the world, mainly in six industries: aerospace, renewable energy, hospitality, real estate, diversified investments, and maritime.

== Early life and education ==
George Logothetis was born on 18 January 1975 in London to Greek parents, and he grew up there. He was educated at Highgate School from 1987 to 1993.

As a very young child he contracted meningitis, a disease which threatened his life and thereafter created debilitating health problems which left him bed-ridden for many days at a time, several times a year, until he had an operation at the age of 36 which cured the condition. He has stated that living with a compromised immune system for so long gave him an enormous appreciation of life and an ability to find inspiration in the face of difficulties.

He is the eldest of four sons of Greek shipping businessman Michael G. Logothetis, and his brothers are Constantine, Nicholas, and Leon. His father started a small shipping business, Lomar Shipping, in 1976. George was exposed to the business from a very early age, and as a teenager he also spent summers abroad learning the details of the trade.

Logothetis began his business career immediately after high school and did not complete a university degree. In 2013, on the merits of his numerous accomplishments and philanthropies, he received an honorary doctorate from the American College of Greece.

== Career ==
Logothetis started working at his father's shipping company, Lomar Shipping, in 1993 at the age of 18. By 1995 he was CEO of the company. Over the next ten years, he enlarged the fleet from less than five to more than 55 ships.

Logothetis's philosophy from the start was to work hard, and then take three to five months off every five years to reflect about the next five years. During these hiatuses, he avoids work emails and phone calls, believing that "ideas need space to be born". On his first sabbatical, he travelled around Asia, and on his second, he did some university studies in New York City.

During his three-month sabbatical in New York, the idea of diversification came to him. In 2003 Logothetis, with his brother Constantine, created and founded Libra Group, based in New York and London, to diversify and expand his company.

Between 2004 and 2007, during a boom in the shipping business, Libra Group sold off most of Lomar's ships. With the profit from the ship sales, the new company purchased a fleet of airplanes, which were at a cyclical low, and set up an aircraft leasing division, Lease Corporation International. Logothetis repeated this successful "buy-low, sell-high" formula of going counter to prevailing market trends several times in the ensuing decade, building a large diversified multinational conglomerate out of what was once a small shipping company.

"The idea behind Libra was to diversify away from shipping to create a global group, using the top lieutenants we had worked with in the preceding years", Logothetis told Reuters in 2013. He told Fortune he "took all the great people from our shipping business, and sent them around the world to start companies. We ended up with a ship's captain running a $200 million real estate company and a Russian fruit seller who runs six biogas plants in Latvia." He later reiterated to BBC News how he expanded and diversified the company: "'We designed a framework of all the places in the world that we wanted to have an office and representation in. Next to each place we put the name of a person that we knew – a family member, a friend or an employee.' These people were sent out to different locations and given the chance to learn new businesses."

In 2006, Libra Group started expanding beyond aviation. Its new major ventures included real estate, hospitality, and renewable energy.

In December 2009, after ship values slumped in the wake of the financial crisis, Logothetis again entered the shipping business and purchased Allocean and its fleet of 26 ships. From December 2009 through December 2014, the company purchased a total of 91 vessels.

Libra Group has also expanded beyond its core businesses of maritime, aerospace, real estate, hospitality, and renewable energy, to include a variety of diversified investments such as media, rare earth minerals, and sleep products. Between 2008 and 2014, the company purchased $7 billion to $7.5 billion of assets globally. As of 2023, Libra Group owns and operates 15 subsidiary companies around the world.

In January 2022, in Pisante v Logothetis, the High Court of Justice found George Logothetis and Libra liable to Swindon Holdings. The court entered judgment against Logothetis for damages to be assessed, with a payment of US$6.25 million plus interest.

In 2024, Libra Group announced that the Group had exited the container shipping market after selling close to 100 vessels for more than $2 billion over several years to focus on innovation and sustainability as new drivers of growth.

In 2023, Libra formed a new aerospace subsidiary (SLI) to tap into the projected $1 trillion space economy. Libra Group aimed to become the world's first space leasing company offering satellites, spaceports, and other infrastructure. Libra is setting up a station in the Alaskan Arctic, vital for polar orbits to monitor climate change. In April 2024, SLI purchased a second ground station in Piteå, Sweden. Since its founding, SLI expanded its portfolio to include traditional aviation and advanced air mobility assets.

Logothetis has been an advocate for and an investor in Greece during the Greek financial crisis. As a result of the crisis, he has become a sought-after business leader for his opinions on investing in Greece and in Greek assets, products, and industries. In June 2012, following prime minister Antonis Samaras's election, he emphasized that the promise of governmental stability was bringing back business confidence and individual confidence in Greece, and noted Libra Group's numerous recent and projected Greek investments and businesses. In March 2013, he cited Samaras's coalition government's relieving the Greek eurozone crisis as a reason investors were returning to, and should continue to return to, Greece. In late 2013, he sounded a cautionary note concerning the "buying frenzy" occurring in the slump-ridden shipping sector. Speaking to a reporter in January 2014 at Davos, he encouraged businesspersons to see the opportunity available in Greece, and stated that he felt that 2014 would be "the year of Greek growth". He reiterated his optimism in March 2014, noting that Libra Group had invested $500 million in Greece since 2012.

== Outreach and philanthropies ==
Logothetis has been publicly active in outreach and philanthropy, particularly in the wake of the Greek financial crisis. At a dinner meeting of 14 Greek Americans seeking to improve the lives of their countrymen, he conceived a plan for an internship program under the auspices of Libra Group, in conjunction with the Greek America Foundation and the American College of Greece, placing young Greeks and Greek Americans in Libra Group and its subsidiaries 26 locations across the world, giving them hope and opportunity. This project became Libra Internship Program, which launched in 2011. Initially focused solely on Greek and Greek diaspora students, As of 2024 the program provides internships for up to 100 students from over 50 countries per year at Libra Group and its subsidiaries, and includes placements for students from socio-economically disadvantaged backgrounds.

Via Libra Philanthropies, Logothetis has also supported MBA students at Athens University of Economics and Business, and engages in a variety of other nonprofit philanthropic and educational programs. In 2012, along with three fellow diaspora Greeks, he founded The Hellenic Initiative, a global nonprofit focused on mobilizing the Greek diaspora and pro-Greek community to invest in Greece through programs of crisis relief, entrepreneurship, and economic development. Also in 2012, Libra Group pledged €5 million to create the initiative's Hellenic Entrepreneurship Award, which provides mentorship and funding to Greek entrepreneurs; as of 2017, Libra Group has committed €10 million to support entrepreneurship in Greece through the award.

At the Greek America Foundation's 2012 National Innovation Conference, he encouraged fellow Greeks to revitalize Greece by rediscovering and implementing philotimo, a complex and comprehensive core Greek value roughly translating as honor and altruism. He also gave detailed inspirational speeches at the 2011 and 2013 Gabby Awards presented by the Greek America Foundation. He has written several articles for the Huffington Post, beginning in 2012.

Logothetis co-founded the nonprofit Seleni Institute, which supports the mental and emotional well-being of women, with his wife Nitzia, who is a psychotherapist. The institute, which was founded in 2011 and launched in 2013 in New York City, promotes the mental health of mothers and their families through funding research, raising and providing awareness, and providing clinical care. George is the treasurer of the organization. In 2014 the Seleni Institute was honored with the Archbishop Iakovos Leadership 100 Award for Excellence.

At the 2012 Concordia Summit, Logothetis introduced Bill Clinton, noting his salient traits of wisdom and empathy. At the 2013 Concordia Summit, he opened the summit with a well-received speech exhorting worldwide business leaders and government officials to empower young people with opportunity and hope, in order to reverse the tide of cynicism and hopelessness and to create a better tomorrow. In 2015 he was appointed Chairman of Concordia's Leadership Council, and he has spoken about leadership, overcoming adversity, and empowering the underdog at Concordia and elsewhere, including a 2016 TEDx talk.

Logothetis is on the board of directors of the My Brother's Keeper (MBK) Alliance, launched in May 2015 by President Obama. Libra Group is a founding sponsor of the program. The MBK Alliance helps young men of color throughout the U.S. reach their full potential, by ensuring and improving educational and workplace opportunities. As part of its involvement with the original My Brother's Keeper Initiative launched by Obama in February 2014, Libra Group has partnered with Leadership Enterprise for a Diverse America (LEDA) by providing internship placements for young men of color at Libra and its global subsidiaries. In 2016, Libra Group also joined two other Obama administration initiatives, the Partnership for Refugees and the Equal Pay Pledge.

In June 2022 Logothetis addressed young Greek entrepreneurs during the ceremony of the Envolve Award in Athens.

In October 2022, Logothetis delivered the keynote address at the 2022 OXI Day Courage Awards honoring Ukrainian President Volodymyr Zelenskyy and Iranian-American journalist Masih Alinejad at the U.S. Institute of Peace in Washington, DC. In April 2023 Logothetis was named Grand Marshal for New York's Greek Independence Day.

As CEO, George led the founding of Libra Social Responsibility, which created 10 social programs. In September 2023, the Logothetis family launched Libra Philanthropies to encompass the Libra Social Responsibility programs. Libra Philanthropies is a fully independent sister organization of Libra Group that was launched by the Logothetis family as a 501(c)(3) foundation. He is its chairman.

In April 2024, Logothetis was named a Global Advisory Council Member of the Woodrow Wilson Center. Also in April, Logothetis was named Grand Marshal for the NYC Greek Independence Day Parade. Logothetis is listed on the board of trustees for Carnegie Hall.

== Recognition ==
- In 2013 Logothetis received an Honorary Doctorate from the American College of Greece.
- In 2014 he and his wife Nitzia received the Archbishop Iakovos Leadership 100 Award for Excellence for their charity the Seleni Institute.
- In 2014 Fortune named him one of its "40 under 40".
- In 2014 he received the Capital Link Leadership Award, for his contribution to numerous educational and philanthropic initiatives globally and in Greece.
- In 2015 he received the Seatrade Young Person in Shipping award.
- In 2015 he received the Lloyd's List Greek Shipping Personality of the Year award.
- In 2017 he received an Honorary Doctorate of Humanities from Hellenic College Holy Cross Greek Orthodox School of Theology.
- In 2017 he received the Corporate Bridge Builder Award from the Tanenbaum Center for Interreligious Understanding.

== Personal life ==
Logothetis and his wife Nitzia (née Embiricos) are based in Manhattan, and have two sons and two daughters. Nitzia, a psychotherapist, is a descendant of a Greek shipping family and grew up in England. She has a psychology degree from Brown University, an MSc in child development from the University of London, and an MA in counseling for mental health and wellness from New York University's Steinhardt School of Culture, Education, and Human Development. In May 2025, Nitzia was awarded an Honorary Doctorate by the University of West Attica. She and George created the Seleni Institute, a non-profit devoted to maternal psychological and physical care.
