= Daniel Edlen =

American painter

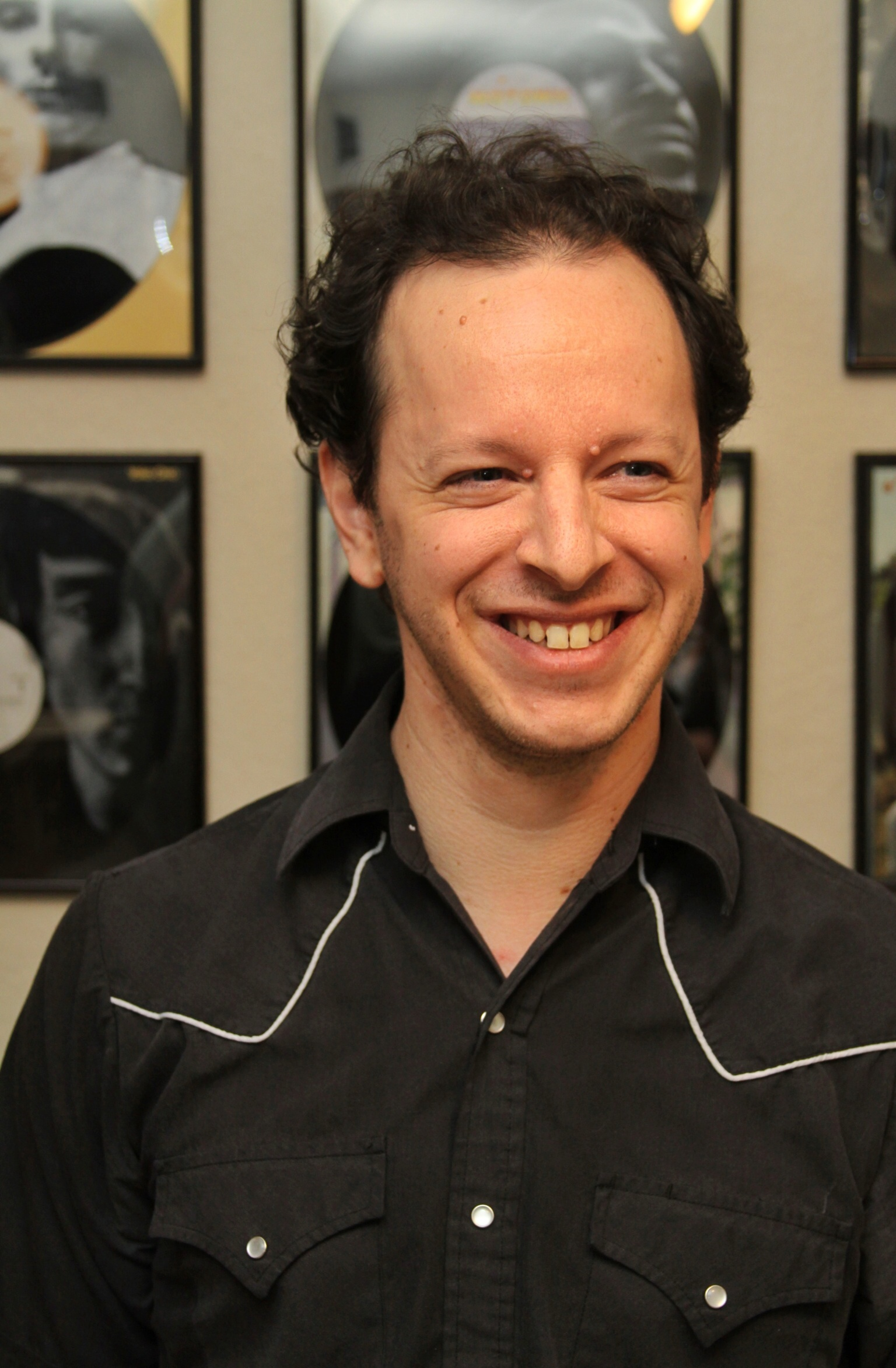
Daniel Edlen, 2010 (photo by Zane Ewton)

Daniel Edlen (born November 18, 1975) is a visual artist known for creating vinyl art, portraits of musicians and entertainers hand-painted on their vinyl records. Raised in Pacific Palisades, CA, he attended the Brentwood Art Center, learning to draw and paint. He also studied Cybernetics at University of California, Los Angeles.

After moving to Arizona, Daniel Edlen began creating his vinyl art using a modified pointillistic technique. White acrylic paint dabbed on creates an image "a bit like a black and white newspaper photo in reverse". It is noted that painting the recycled records is "a meticulous process that... often translates to one hyper-realistic rendering per month". It's also been remarked that it is "a truly unique message-meets-medium portraiture technique, using the physical canvas of artists’ talent — their records — to paint portraits of them in white acrylic." Notable works have been shown by VH1, commissioned by the Seminole Hard Rock Hotel and Casino Hollywood and VEVO, as well as done for the Roger Steffens Reggae Archives. Edlen was also commissioned by the David Lynch Foundation to paint a series of pieces, which were signed by the artists like Tom Waits and Iggy Pop to be auctioned to benefit the foundation. In an interview with Phoenix Magazine, Edlen stated his reason for creating his Vinyl Art, "They celebrate the subject and the object, the art and the artifact.”
