= Ramani Ayer =

American-Indian business executive

- Born: 27 May 1947 (age 78); Kerala, India
- Education: Indian Institute of Technology; Drexel University
- Employer: The Hartford
- Title: CEO
- Term: 1991–2009
- Predecessor: Donald R. Frahm
- Successor: Liam McGee
- Board member of: American Insurance Association
- Website: The Hartford

Ramani Ayer (born 27 May 1947 in Kerala, India) is an Indian-American business executive, and the CEO and chairman of The Hartford from 1997 to 2009.

== Education ==
Ayer earned his bachelor's degree in chemical engineering from the Indian Institute of Technology Bombay in 1969 and his Masters and Ph.D. from Drexel University in Philadelphia, Pennsylvania, in 1973. Ayer has practiced Transcendental Meditation since the 1970s.

== Career ==
Ayer began working for The Hartford after receiving his Ph.D. in 1973.

Ayer became vice president of HartRe, The Hartford's reinsurance subsidiary in 1983, president of Hartford Specialty Company in 1986, and senior vice president of The Hartford in 1989. He then became executive vice president of The Hartford in 1990, and president and COO of the company's property-casualty operations in 1991. After being elected CEO in 1996, he took the office of chairman and CEO of The Hartford on 1 February 1997.

In 2007, Ayer was one of three foreign-born Indian-origin executives to run a Fortune 100 company.

In June 2009, after facing pressure from the company shareholders, Ayer announced his retirement from The Hartford by the end of the year. He stepped down as CEO on 1 October 2009. He received a $39.9 million lump sum pension in 2010, a particular pension plan provided by Hartford.

While CEO, Ayer served as a member of the Business Roundtable representing The Hartford. Ayer sat on the board of directors for the American Insurance Association and the Hartford Hospital while also serving as a trustee of the Connecticut Center for Science and Exploration.

In 2011, Ayer was appointed to the board of directors of XL Group, a financial services company.

== Transcendental Meditation ==
At the age 24, Ayer learned to meditate and completed the basic Transcendental Meditation program while studying at Drexel. He believes Transcendental Meditation has enabled him to manage professional and personal success. He also took part to the Global Peace Initiative. He served on the board of Maharishi University of Management (MUM) where his son studied.

Ayer has been a trustee of the David Lynch Foundation.

== Personal life ==
Ayer is married to Louise. They have two children. Ayer is of Tamil descent.
