= William Antholis =

Greek-American political scientist

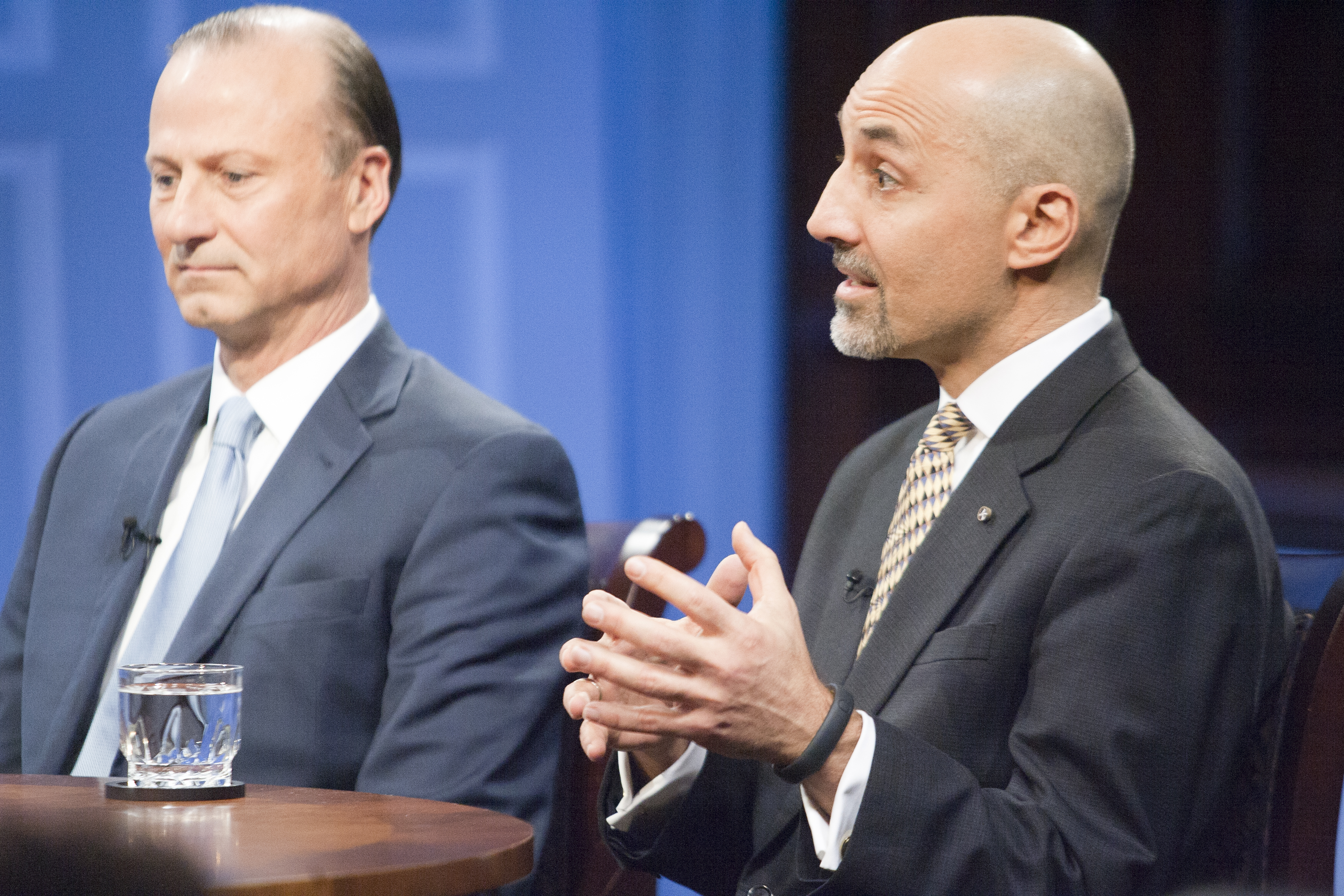
Jeffrey W. Legro and William J. Antholis (February 25, 2015)

William John Antholis (born c. 1965) is a Greek-American political scientist. He is director and CEO of the Miller Center of Public Affairs, a nonpartisan affiliate of the University of Virginia that specializes in presidential scholarship, public policy, and political history and strives to apply the lessons of history to the nation's most pressing contemporary governance challenges. Prior to that, Antholis served as managing director of the Brookings Institution, a Washington think tank. He currently serves as a non-resident senior fellow at Brookings. His research interests include subnational governance and federalism, energy policy, bottom-up efforts and international negotiations around climate change, the role of democracy, and community development.

== Biography ==
Raised in Florham Park, New Jersey, Antholis attended the Delbarton School, graduating in 1983. He received a BA in government from the University of Virginia in 1986 and a Ph.D. in politics from Yale University in 1993. He was a visiting fellow at Princeton University's Center of International Studies, and an international affairs fellow of the Council on Foreign Relations. He was then director of studies and Senior Fellow at the German Marshall Fund, where he directed their Trade and Poverty Forum. Special Advisor, Office of Planning, U.S. Department of State (1995–1997)

He was also Special Advisor, Office of Planning, U.S. Department of State and then Director of its Office of Policy Analysis in the Bureau of Economics and Business Affairs. He served the White House as Director of International Economic Affairs, Senior Advisor to the National Security Advisor, and National Economic Advisor, in President Bill Clinton's administration from 1997 to 1999. He has additionally been an adjunct professor of International Politics at Syracuse University's Washington Program.

In 1991, he co-founded the Civic Education Project, a nonprofit organization that supported western-trained teachers in the social sciences at universities in twenty-three countries in Central and Eastern Europe; it was absorbed into the Central Eastern European University in 2007.

Antholis serves on the Leadership Council for Concordia, a nonpartisan, nonprofit based in New York City focused on promoting effective public-private collaboration to create a more prosperous and sustainable future.

== Publications ==
Antholis and Strobe Talbott co-authored Fast Forward: Ethics and Politics in the Age of Global Warming in 2010. In 2013, he published Inside Out, India and China. Both books were published by the Brookings Institution Press.

He has also published the following articles:

- "Pragmatic Engagement or Photo Op: What Will the G-8 Become?" in The Washington Quarterly, v24 n3 (2001): 213-226
- "Do Democracies Fight each other? Evidence from the Peloponnesian War" (with Bruce Russett) Journal of Peace Research November 1992 vol. 29 no. 4 415-434

He was senior author of the Brookings and Washington Post series: "How we're doing: A composite index of global and national trends & Metropolitan Las Vegas: Challenges, opportunities, and a vision". He was lead compiler of the 2009 Brookings Institution election guide for the 2008 election, "Candidate Issue Index: Climate Change" and, with Strobe Talbott, wrote the Brookings Institution report "Tackling Trade and Climate Change: Leadership on the Home Front of Foreign Policy" and "Five 'Gs': Lessons from World Trade for Governing Global Climate Change" published in the Brookings Trade Forum 2008–2009.
