= Sora bint Saud Al Saud =

Saudi Arabian princess, entrepreneur, and philanthropist

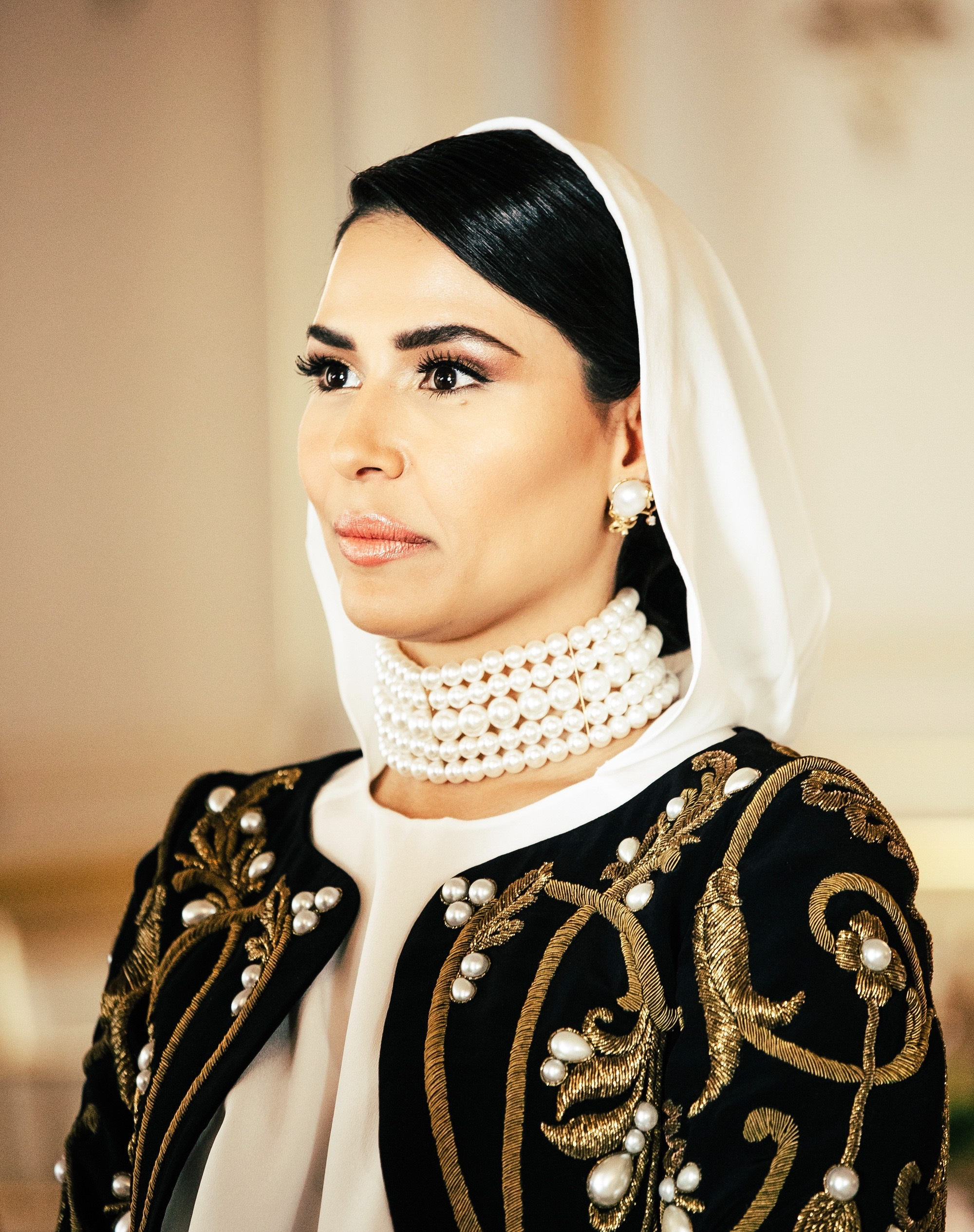
Princess Sora bint Saud Al Saud

Sora bint Saud bin Saad Al Saud (Arabic: سرى بنت سعود بن سعد آل سعود) is a Saudi Arabian royal and businessperson. She is a member of the House of Saud and the granddaughter of Abdullah bin Abdulaziz Al Saud, who was king of Saudi Arabia from 2005 until his death in 2015. Sora is married to Prince Abdulaziz bin Talal Al Saud, son of Prince Talal bin Abdulaziz Al Saud.

== Biography ==
In 2015, she received a Bachelor of Arts degree in psychology from American University.

In partnership with her husband, Prince Abdulaziz bin Talal Al Saud, she established the Ahyaha Foundation. In 2017, Sora became an Honorary Ambassador for Mentor Foundation USA – International. She launched a jewelry business, Loren Jewels.
