= Salisbury School =

Prep school in Salisbury, Connecticut, US

Location
- 251 Canaan Road; Salisbury, Connecticut 06068; United States; 41°59′55″N 73°23′32″W

Information
- Type: College preparatory school
- Motto: Esse quam videri
- Established: 1901 (125 years ago)
- CEEB code: 070655
- Faculty: 82
- Grades: 9-12
- Enrollment: 330
- Student to teacher ratio: 5:1
- Campus size: 740 acres (3.0 km^{2})
- Colors: Crimson, white, black
- Athletics: 33 interscholastic teams
- Mascot: Knight
- Endowment: $100 million
- Tuition: $78,671.10 Boarding $62,798.65 Day
- Website: www.salisburyschool.org

Salisbury School is an elite all-boys, private college-preparatory boarding school in Salisbury, Connecticut. It was founded in 1901 by the Reverend George E. Quaile, former headmaster of St. Austin's Military School in Staten Island, New York.

Its school newspaper is The Cupola. Its mascot is the Crimson Knight.

In 2015, Business Insider ranked it the most expensive private high school in the United States.

== Notable alumni ==
- Prince Ali bin Al Hussein (1993) - Brother of King Abdullah II of Jordan; Vice-President, FIFA
- Mark Arcobello (2006) - Professional hockey player (HC Lugano), US Olympic Team (2018)
- Christopher Atkins (1980) - Actor, The Blue Lagoon, The Pirate Movie, A Night in Heaven, and others
- Alex Biega (2006) - Professional hockey player (Vancouver Canucks)
- Peter Bohlin (1955) - Architect; designer of Apple retail stores worldwide.
- Josiah Bunting III (1957) - Educator and author; retired superintendent of Virginia Military Institute
- Paul Carey (2007) - Professional hockey player (New York Rangers)
- Porter Collins (1993) - US Olympic oarsman (1996, 2000), three-time World Champion (1995, 1998, 1999)
- Rahsul Faison (2019) - former New England Player of the Year, MVP for the Erickson League, Running Back for the South Carolina Gamecocks
- Ryan Frazier (2012) - basketball coach (Charlotte Hornets)
- Ben Greenspan (2002) - college baseball coach (Northwestern)
- John E. Herlitz (1960) - Automotive Designer - Chrysler Senior VP Product Design
- Elliot Hovey (2002) - US Olympic oarsman (2008, 2012)
- Justin Hryckowian (2018) - Professional hockey player (Dallas Stars)
- Jay Kemmerer (1966) - Owner, Jackson Hole Mountain Ski Resort
- Thomas Kiefer (1976) - US Olympic Silver Medalist oarsman (1984)
- Patrick Mazeika (born 1993) - baseball player
- Harold McGraw III (1968) - Chairman of the Board, McGraw Hill Financial
- Brodie Merrill (2001) - Professional lacrosse player (Boston Cannons, Toronto Rock)
- D.A. Pennebaker (1942) – Documentary filmmaker
- William B. Ruger (1933) - Co-founder, Sturm, Ruger & Co.
- Emmet Sheehan (2018) - Professional baseball pitcher (Los Angeles Dodgers)
- Matthew Swift (2006) – Co-founder, Chairman, and CEO of the Concordia Summit
- Will Toffey (2014) - Professional baseball player
- Will Tye (2010) - Professional football player, (New York Giants, New York Jets)
- G. Mennen "Soapy" Williams (1929) - Governor of Michigan, Justice on Michigan Supreme Court
