= David Lynch Foundation =

Non-profit organization

Coordinates: 41.0180°N 91.9688°W

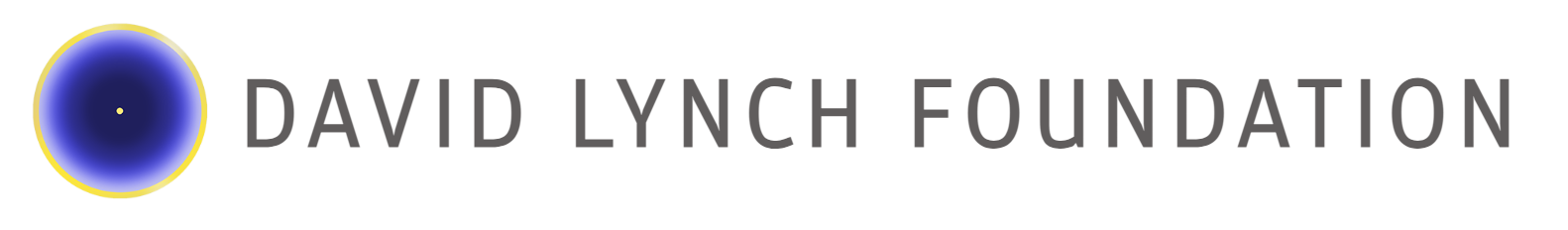
- Logo of the foundation
- Founded: 2005; 21 years ago
- Founder: David Lynch
- Tax ID no.: 83-0436453
- Legal status: 501(c)(3)
- Purpose: Transcendental Meditation
- Location: Fairfield, Iowa, U.S.
- Region served: North and South America
- Key people: John Hagelin, Bob Roth, Ramani Ayer
- Affiliations: Maharishi International University; Maharishi School
- Revenue: $9.3 million (2023)
- Expenses: $9.3 million (2023)
- Website: www.davidlynchfoundation.org

The David Lynch Foundation for Consciousness-Based Education and World Peace (or simply DLF) is a global charitable foundation with offices in New York City, Los Angeles, and Fairfield, Iowa. It was founded by film director and Transcendental Meditation (TM) practitioner David Lynch in 2005 to fund the teaching of TM in schools. Over the years it has expanded its focus to include other "at-risk" populations such as the homeless, U.S. military veterans, African war refugees and prison inmates.

The Foundation is reported to have sponsored between 70,000 and 150,000 students in 350 schools throughout the U.S. and South America. The Foundation also sponsors research on the TM program.

== Description ==
According to the DLF web site, David Lynch Foundation for Consciousness-Based Education is a non-profit organization, established to "fund the implementation of scientifically proven stress-reducing modalities" for "at-risk populations", including U.S. veterans and African war refugees with post-traumatic stress disorder (PTSD), inner city students, American Indians, homeless and incarcerated men. The DLF also funds research to "assess the effects of the program on academic performance, ADHD and other learning disorders, anxiety, depression, substance abuse, cardiovascular disease, post-traumatic stress disorder, and diabetes". In 2005, the DLF announced the long-term goal of raising $7 billion in order to establish seven affiliated "Universities of World Peace" in seven different countries, to train students to practice Transcendental Meditation and become "professional peacemakers". DLF.TV is the Foundation's production wing and online television channel that provides video content and web casts.

The Foundation is governed by a board of directors consisting of: John Hagelin, Jeffrey S. Abramson, Rona Abramson, Ramani Ayer, Robert G. Brown, Joni Steele Kimberlin, Arthur Liebler, and Nancy Liebler. As of 2011, the Foundation's board of advisors included: Russell Simmons, Gary P. Kaplan, William R. Stixrud, Frank Staggers Jr., César Molina, George H. Rutherford, Carmen N’Namdi, Ralph Wolff, Ashley Deans, Linda Handy, and Sarina Grosswald. Charity Navigator "Your Guide To Intelligent Giving" evaluated "David Lynch Foundation for Consciousness-Based Education”.

== History ==
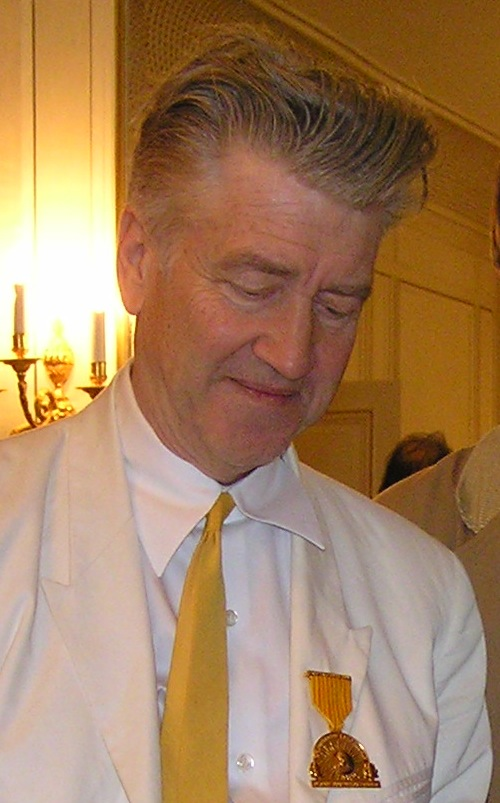
Founder and namesake of the foundation, David Lynch, in Paris during 2007

Concerned about school violence and increasing stress and problems for students, David Lynch founded the DLF in July 2005 "to provide the [TM] program to schools". That year, Lynch, DLF president John Hagelin, and Maharishi University of Management researcher Fred Travis went on a lecture tour titled "Consciousness, Creativity, and the Brain". Tour dates included the University of Southern California, UC Berkeley, the University of Oregon in Eugene, the University of Washington, Emerson College, Yale University, and Brown University. In 2005, Lynch offered to fund (for-credit) peace studies courses at several universities with TM instruction being included in each course.

By 2006, six public schools in the U.S. had been awarded $25,000 by the David Lynch Foundation. NEA Today described the DLF as an organization "which provides funding for students in grades 4 to 12 to learn Transcendental Meditation" and reported that DLF had "helped approximately 500 students and 50 teachers learn how to meditate and "about 1,500 more" were scheduled to learn in the fall. In October the Foundation withdrew a $175,000 pledge to a San Rafael, California, high school after the anti-separation Pacific Justice Institute threatened to sue for violating the First Amendment's Establishment Clause. That year Lynch assigned all of his proceeds from the sale of his book Catching the Big Fish to the DLF and the Foundation sponsored a presentation on the benefits of TM in education at the Harvard Club of Boston.

Natural Health magazine reported in 2007 that the DLF had given $3 million in sponsorship to 20 U.S. schools located in the city of Washington, D.C., and various states including Arizona, New York, California, Colorado, Connecticut, and Michigan. By 2008, the Foundation had funded TM courses for more than 2,000 students, faculty and parents at 21 universities and schools in the U.S., in addition to substantially higher numbers at schools overseas. That year DLF funded the TM program at two schools in Steamboat Springs, Colorado. A 2010 Wall Street Journal article reported that since 2005, Lynch had personally "donated half a million dollars to help finance scholarships for 150,000 students who are interested in learning transcendental meditation". The Jerusalem Post reported in 2009 that the DLF had "provided scholarships to more than 60,000 people interested in practicing Transcendental Meditation throughout the United States, Latin America, the Middle East and Africa."

In 2011 the press reported that DLF had "raised millions of dollars" to finance the teaching of the TM technique to "150,000 people, mostly students, worldwide", including a "handful" of San Francisco's public schools while an ABC News article reported the Foundation had sponsored "70,000 students for free in 350 schools around the world; 15 of them are in the United States."

In 2012, The New York Times and other press reported that the DLF had expanded its programs to include other at-risk populations such as "veterans with post-traumatic stress disorder and their families, homeless people and incarcerated juveniles and adults".

In April 2013, Lynch released the film Meditation, Creativity, Peace which documents his 2007 speaking engagements at European and Middle Eastern film schools in 16 countries. According to Lynch, profits from the distribution of the film would benefit DLF's meditation instruction for students around the world. The film was described by one reviewer as a "fragmented, self-important film noir".

In recent years, the David Lynch Foundation has opened branches in a number of other countries including The UK, France, Georgia and Australia.

In April 2022, Lynch announced an initiative to fund training in transcendental meditation for 30,000 international university students to "become advanced peace-creating meditation experts and build a legacy of lasting global peace." The initiative was created in partnership with the Global Union of Scientists for Peace and Maharishi International University. It will invest approximately $500 million in its first year. It will fund meditation training for 10,000 students at Maharishi International University, 10,000 students at its sister school in India, and 10,000 students at partner universities in 10 locations across the globe.

=== Fundraising events ===
==== 2009–2011 ====
With the goal of teaching TM to 1 million high risk youth, the Foundation sponsored the 2009 "Change Begins Within" benefit concert, held at Radio City Music Hall and hosted by Lynch and Laura Dern. Guest speakers and performers included Paul McCartney, Ringo Starr, Donovan, Moby, Eddie Vedder, Ben Harper, Paul Horn, Jim James, Bettye LaVette, Sheryl Crow, Angelo Badalamenti, Russell Simmons, Mike Love, Jerry Seinfeld and Howard Stern.

The Foundation held its second "Change Begins Within" benefit event, titled "Operation Warrior Wellness", at the Metropolitan Museum of Art in New York in December 2010. Participants included Lynch, actor Clint Eastwood, designer Donna Karan, comedian Russell Brand and several war veterans. In April 2011, the Foundation launched David Lynch Foundation Music with their "Download for Good" campaign through PledgeMusic. Items available for pledges included collector's items from Shepard Fairey and original vinyl art created by Daniel Edlen which was signed by the donating musicians. The DLF released a compilation titled "Download for Good: Music That Changes The World" in July 2011 via iTunes and then on 21 April 2012 (for Record Store Day) as a box set, featuring 34 artists, including Ben Folds, Donovan, Moby, Iggy Pop, Peter Gabriel, Tom Waits, Maroon 5 and Alanis Morissette, and the box set also includes a bonus track by Sean Lennon and a digital download code for one by Julio Iglesias Jr., as well as a book illustrated by Romio Shrestha and Davel Hamue, and a digital version of the documentary film, Meditation, Creativity, Peace.

==== 2012 and 2013 ====
In June 2012 Jerry Seinfeld hosted a DLF fundraiser called "A Night of Comedy" honoring George Shapiro which was held in Beverly Hills, California, US. Performers and guests included Russell Brand, Sarah Silverman, Garry Shandling, Jason Alexander, Julia Louis-Dreyfus, Chris Rock, and Danny DeVito.

In January 2013 DLF sponsored a benefit jazz concert in New York City. The program featured comments by TV hosts Mehmet Oz and George Stephanopoulos, and actress Liv Tyler. Musical performances included Herbie Hancock, Corrine Bailey Rae and Wynton Marsalis. In February, it sponsored another Operation Warrior Wellness fund raiser at the New York Athletic Club in New York City.

In 2013 the DLF founded a "charity based music label" called Transcendental Music, to raise funds and awareness for its programs. In August, 2013 The Independent announced Russell Brand would raise funds for the David Lynch Foundation while on his "Messiah Complex" tour. In the fall, there were two fundraising events for New York City's first responders with post-traumatic stress disorder that featured celebrities Liv Tyler, Royston Langdon, Sean Lennon, and Hugh Jackman. Later that month, Jack White and Brendan Benson performed a charity concert for DLF at the Ryman Auditorium in Nashville, Tennessee.

==== 2015 ====
In an event described by Rolling Stone as "otherworldly" artists supporting the work of the Foundation appeared at the Theatre at Ace Hotel in Los Angeles on 1 April 2015. The evening, entitled "The Music of David Lynch", launched the DLF's tenth anniversary celebrations, and helped to raise funds to teach Transcendental Meditation to 1,000 at-risk youth in Los Angeles. Performers included Angelo Badalamenti, Chrysta Bell, Donovan, Duran Duran, Jim James, Julee Cruise, Karen O, Tennis, Twin Peaks, Kinny Landrum, Lykke Li, Moby, Rebekah Del Rio, Rob Mathes, Sky Ferreira, Wayne Coyne and Steven Drozd of the Flaming Lips, and Zola Jesus.

On 4 November 2015, the Foundation organised a benefit concert at New York City's Carnegie Hall, "Change Begins Within", "to provide Transcendental Meditation instruction to 10,000 at-risk New Yorkers at no cost". Performers included Katy Perry, Sting, Jerry Seinfeld, Angelique Kidjo, Jim James, and Sharon Isbin. Rolling Stone quoted Perry as telling the audience, "I started TMing about five years ago, and it's changed my life."

== Sponsored programs ==
According to the DLF website, the Foundation's sponsorship encompasses programs for schools, military, homeless shelters, prisons and global outreach.

=== Schools ===
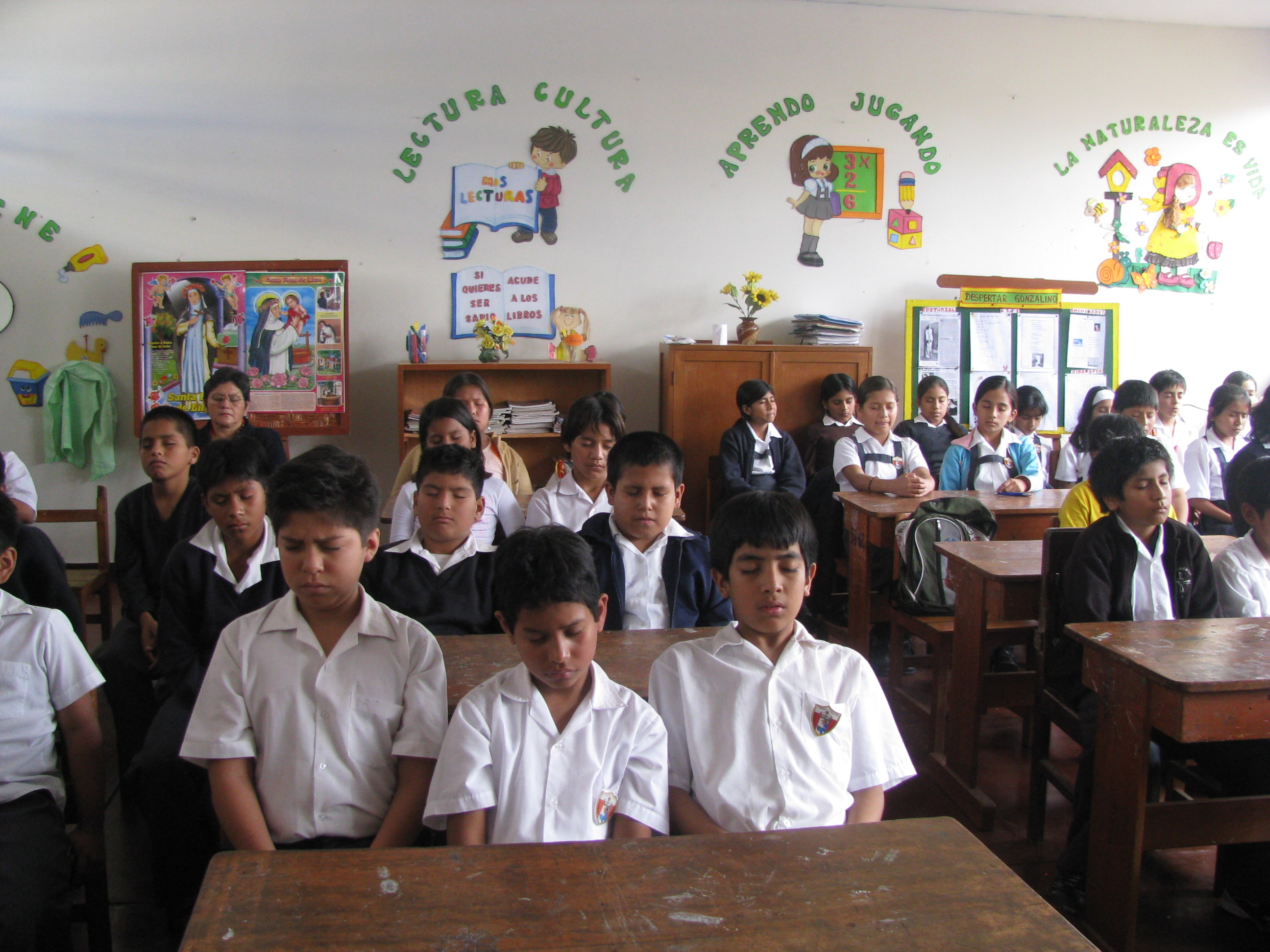
DLF-funded program in a Peruvian school

The Foundation's web site says it focuses on school-wide instruction in Transcendental Meditation with the aim of improving educational and health outcomes. Its school programs, dubbed "Quiet Time", are voluntary, and require parental permission. According to the Foundation, the programs are offered to students and faculty at no cost to the parents or school. The Foundation has reportedly funded school programs in the U.S. cities of Washington, D.C; New York City; Hartford, Connecticut; Detroit, Michigan; San Francisco, California; and in the countries of Brazil, Peru, Bolivia, Vietnam, Nepal, Northern Ireland, Ghana, Kenya, Uganda, South Africa and Israel. In 2007, DLF began sponsoring Quiet Time at Visitacion Valley Middle School, providing an annual grant that covers most of the $175,000 cost of dedicated staff to run the program, as well as supporting three other schools in San Francisco. As of 2007 another ten schools in the same San Francisco district were waiting to start the program. After studying the program, Carlos Garcia, school district superintendent, concluded that Quiet Time was a secular program that calms students and allows them to learn.

DLF funded Transcendental Meditation courses for students at the Lowell Whiteman Primary School in Boulder, Colorado in 2008. In 2009, Church and State magazine reported that the Americans United for the Separation of Church and State had characterized the David Lynch Foundation's funding of Transcendental Meditation for public school students as undermining the constitutional separation of church and state. In 2011, music mogul Russell Simmons announced plans to provide financial support to the David Lynch Foundation to teach TM at Hillhouse High School in New Haven, Connecticut. In 2009 the DLF provided $120,000 to fund a Transcendental Meditation Club at the Tucson Magnet High School in Arizona, U.S. which had offered TM courses to 160 students, staff, and faculty as of 2010.

=== Military ===
In 2006 Lynch made a personal donation of $100,000 and the DLF inaugurated Operation Warrior Wellness (a DLF national initiative) whose goal is to teach the TM technique to 10,000 veterans with post-traumatic stress disorder and other war related ailments. Since 2010 DLF has contributed almost $1 million to sponsor TM courses for veterans and their families. The Transcendental Meditation technique's effect on post-traumatic stress syndrome (PTSD) is the topic of research at the University of Colorado and was the topic of a study published in Military Medicine in 2011. Other initiatives to teach the TM technique to war veterans who are at risk for PTSD are ongoing. The DLF sponsored TM technique instruction for students at Norwich University, a private military academy, as part of a long-term study on meditation and military performance. The DLF raises funds to cover the $500 per person cost of TM training for military personnel. According to Bob Roth, executive director of the David Lynch Foundation, the US Department of Defense is examining potential advantages of TM for veterans of Iraq and Afghanistan. In order to procure support from the US government, the Foundation is striving to teach 10,000 veterans, active soldiers, trainees, and their families.

Recent research shows that regular practice of Transcendental Meditation technique enables some active duty service members battling post-traumatic stress disorder to reduce or even eliminate their psychotropic medication and get better control of their often-debilitating symptoms, researchers report in the journal Military Medicine. Transcendental Meditation technique shows marked efficacy in treating anxiety disorders says a meta-analysis of randomized controlled trials, "TM practice is more effective than treatment as usual and most alternative treatments, with greatest effects observed in individuals with high anxiety." A meta-analysis says: "Differential effects of relaxation techniques on trait anxiety: a meta-analysis. Effect sizes for the different treatments (e.g., Progressive Relaxation, EMG Biofeedback, various forms of meditation, etc.) were calculated. Most of the treatments produced similar effect sizes except that Transcendental Meditation had significantly larger effect size (p less than .005)"

=== Social programs ===
The DLF began a program in 2010, at a Van Nuys, California, youth shelter called Children of the Night. The David Lynch Foundation also produced the video "Saving the Disposable Ones", about the work of Father Gabriel Mejia and the Fundación Hogares Claret, dedicated to rescuing and rehabilitating homeless children in Colombia. According to the DLF web site, Father Mejia has founded 47 shelters for homeless children where thousands of young people practice the Transcendental Meditation technique. The Foundation now teaches TM to prisoners.

=== Research ===
DLF has donated for research on the effects of TM at the University of Connecticut and the University of Michigan. By 2008 the DLF had donated $5 million to research on the TM program. According to a 2009 press release on PsychCentral, DLF made plans that year to provide a $2 million grant to fund research on the "effects of the [TM] technique on ADHD and other learning disorders". In 2015 the David Lynch Foundation collaborated with Seleni Institute on the Seleni Research Award to create the Perinatal Mental Health Research Award, in support of research on Transcendental Meditation in treating perinatal anxiety.
