= Lease Corporation International =

| IATA | ICAO | Call sign |
|---|---|---|
| — | LCI | — |
- Founded: 2004
- Headquarters: Dublin, Ireland
- Key people: Adam Tomazos (Chairman); Crispin Maunder (CEO)
- Website: www.lciaviation.com

Lease Corporation International is a company based in Dublin, Ireland, which offers a wide range of aircraft leasing to various airlines. LCI is a subsidiary of Libra Group, which is headed by George Logothetis.

Lease Corporation International was founded in 2004. The subsidiary leases fixed-wing aircraft to airlines in Europe and Asia, including Singapore Airlines, British Airways, Virgin Atlantic, Oman Air, and Hong Kong Express Airways. After selling its fleet of aircraft in 2007, LCI purchased new aircraft in 2009. In 2012, LCI expanded into helicopter leasing. Helicopters leased by LCI are used by offshore oil operations, and for search and rescue as well as emergency medical services. LCI offices are located in Ireland, the United Kingdom, and Singapore.

== Fleet ==
As of 2018, the LCI fleet consists of the following types of aircraft:

Helicopters

- Airbus H175
- Airbus H130
- Leonardo AW139
- Leonardo AW169
- Leonardo AW189
- Sikorsky S-76C

Airplanes

- Boeing 747-400F
- Bombardier CS100
- Bombardier CS300
