= Partnership for Refugees =

President Barack Obama addresses the United Nations General Assembly in 2010.

The Partnership for Refugees is a refugee public-private partnership established in June 2016 as the Partnership for Refugees by the Obama administration to facilitate President Barack Obama's commitment to creative solutions for the refugee crisis by engaging the private sector. The Partnership, an initiative established through collaboration between the State Department and USA for UNHCR with significant support from Accenture Federal Services, was established to facilitate private sector commitments in response to President Obama's June 30, 2016 Call to Action for Private Sector Engagement on the Global Refugee Crisis. On September 20, 2016, at the Leaders Summit on Refugees at the United Nations, President Obama announced that 51 companies from across the American economy have pledged to make new, measurable and significant commitments that will have a durable impact on refugees residing in countries on the front lines of the global refugee crisis and in countries of resettlement, like the United States.

The commitments total came to more than $650 million to support 6.3 million refugees across more than 20 countries.

== Participants and Call to Action commitments ==
Public sector organizations engaged in and leading the initiative include the USA for UNHCR, the United States Department of State and the United States Agency for International Development. In October 2016, the Tent Foundation was born in the light of this initiative.

The partnership was established with the participation of 51 legacy businesses, brands, and technology companies. The initial commitments included three focus areas – education, employment and enablement – to align with Leaders' Summit goals.

The participants' commitments, announced on September 20, 2016, included a range of direct and indirect interventions around refugees and displaced peoples, including:

- 180LA pledged to provide its advertising, digital, social media, and design services to raise awareness of the refugee crisis and welcome resettled refugees.
- Accenture committed to providing over $3 million in financial support and in-kind strategic consulting, program management, and digital services to support the Partnership for Refugees and Upwardly Global. In regards to Upwardly Global, Accenture is expanding its refugee workforce programs in the United States and globally as aligned to its global Skills to Succeed program. Accenture is also collaborating with UNHCR to launch a connectivity strategy for refugees and with USA for UNHCR through the Accenture Innovation Challenge to increase its impact on refugees while raising awareness among graduate students nationally.
- Airbnb committed to developing a program that enables existing Airbnb hosts temporarily to accommodate refugee families when long-term housing is not immediately available; expand its initiative to host relief workers through the travel credits program; develop a job creation strategy for Syrian refugees in Jordan through a livelihoods pilot program; and create a social media campaign to allow its hosts and guests to raise funds for the UNHCR.
- Alight Fund pledged to raise $100 million in micro-loan capital to invest in 50,000 refugee and host community small-business entrepreneurs. The pilot program will be launched in Iraqi Kurdistan.
- Autodesk pledged to make an estimated $2 million software donation to UNHCR, offering 141 subscription licenses of Autodesk Infrastructure Design Suite Ultimate and 141 subscription licenses of Autodesk InfraWorks to support UNHCR's physical settlement planning and design capacity, and also to recommend a financial grant of $50,000 to support the adoption of technical solutions to help refugees in conjunction with Microdesk.
- BanQu, Inc. committed to creating mobile phone-based block chain economic profiles through its Economic Identity Platform for approximately 1.5 – 2.0 million refugees by the end of 2017.
- Bloom Five committed to providing 10 hours per month of professional development services – including technical assistance and workshops on resume and cover letter writing, written and oral presentations, seminars, mock interviews, and employment-related networking – to resettled refugees in the United States.
- BRCK committed to providing digital access and developing digital educational content and resources for children, youth, and women in refugee camps.
- Citigroup pledged to collaborate with its public and private sector clients as well as with its strategic partners to focus on sustainable solutions that are responsive to the needs of refugees. These solutions include initiatives that target youth education and employability, as well as collaboration with sovereigns and the international development community on ideas around creative financing solutions to unlock funding to address the needs of displaced persons. Citi will continue to optimize its relationships with the supranational agencies and NGOs that operate in conflict and refugee zones.
- Chobani pledged to continue its ongoing commitment to welcome people from all over the world to join the company, including those in its local communities who are resettled refugees. It will look for ways to support the broader business community by sharing its experiences and learnings, and work with the Partnership for Refugees to help ensure this insight is incorporated into research and materials to improve cross-sector knowledge.
- Coursera pledged to launch and support Coursera for Refugees in conjunction with the Department of State. Coursera for Refugees enables an unlimited number of non-profits that work with refugees to apply for at least one year of group financial aid. Partner non-profit organizations will be able to support refugees in quickly building career skills and gaining recognizable certificates through access to the 1,000+ Coursera courses offered by leading universities. Coursera for Refugees also includes organizational support services for partner non-profit organizations.
- DSM pledged to develop programs enabling refugees to obtain employment; develop employee volunteer programs to facilitate the development of language and cultural skills of refugees resettling in the United States; offer programs to refugees on nutrition improvement and education; and continue to work with leading organizations such as Upwardly Global, WFP, UNICEF, Global Health Corp, and World Vision to ensure that refugees have opportunity, nutrition, and healthcare.
- Facebook pledged to bring Wi-Fi connectivity to 35 locations across Greece, in partnership with NetHope; develop a strategy for bringing internet connectivity to individuals living in refugee camps and surrounding communities, in partnership with UNHCR and local partners; leverage the Facebook social media platform to raise awareness and funds for the refugee crisis; and donate advertising credits and creative services support to UNHCR and other refugee-serving organizations.
- Figure 8 Investment Strategies pledged to recruit, hire, and train refugees and provide refugee employees with access to key industry licenses and certifications (CFA, CFP, Series 7, 63, 65); partner with Global Talent Idaho and the Idaho Department. of Labor to provide skilled refugees with internship and apprenticeship opportunities in financial analysis and investment advising; support refugee communities in Idaho with pro-bono financial literacy training and advice; and source goods and services from refugee-owned business wherever possible.
- Goldman Sachs pledged to donate $7.5 million to support refugees in partnership with leading NGOs, including UNHCR. Specifically, Goldman will: provide support to organizations delivering critical humanitarian aid, including food, shelter, urgent medical care, and trauma support; help ensure refugee children have access to consistent education and safe learning facilities throughout camps in and around Syria; create a new online 10,000 Women program that will teach entrepreneurial and business skills; and support positive refugee integration in European host countries by providing English language, employability skills, and other training opportunities.
- Google pledged to provide new funding and technical expertise to organizations enabling 10,000 out-of-school primary school-aged refugees in Lebanon to access free formal education through a new primary school classroom model in 2017.
- Henry Schein pledged, over the next three years, to donate $350K in essential health care products to an international aid organization to support volunteer physicians providing care to Syrian refugees in Europe and the Middle East. Henry Schein will also donate $100,000 in oral care products to support volunteer dentists treating refugees, and 7,500 health and hygiene kits for refugees living in camps, including specialized kits for women and girls.
- HP Inc. pledges to establish 6 HP Learning Studios in Lebanon and Jordan to engage refugee youth in developing skills and help to give refugee students access to the latest education technology while providing adults the opportunity for employment re-skilling. HP also pledges to expand the HP Learning Initiative for Entrepreneurs (HP LIFE) with additional free online courses and curated content to help refugees develop essential business and IT skills; connect Girl Scouts in the Washington D.C. area with young Syrian refugee girls for one-to-one peer learning and mentoring; actively pursue the purchase of online freelance services from refugees; enable access to technology and HP LIFE e-learning for refugees at the International Medical Corps Livelihoods Center pilot in Turkey; and explore IT infrastructure solutions.
- IBM pledges to continue its ongoing commitment in support of migrants and refugees, with a focus on the crisis in Europe. IBM intends to continue actively seeking grant partnerships, volunteerism opportunities, and other avenues to leverage IBM's capabilities in support of this humanitarian crisis.
- IKEA pledges to introduce a national community involvement activity in Fiscal Year 2017, in partnership with select refugee non-profit organizations, and to use IKEA's furniture and home furnishing expertise to help refugees in the United States. This estimated in-kind donation will be worth approximately $500,000.
- Johnson & Johnson pledged to donate an additional $1.75 million to Save the Children, earmarked for refugees, to be spent in 2016 and 2017; to expand programmatic efforts to Turkey and Egypt; to shift its program focus to refugee education, mental health support, and community building initiatives for refugee parents; and to launch a public awareness-campaign in support of refugees.
- Karp Randel pledged to leverage their corporate network and expertise to garner more support for the Partnership for Refugees and encourage others to submit pledges and to support the future host organization.
- Kleiman International Consultants committed to establishing a multisector taskforce and organizing a Private Sector Financing Forum to develop innovative financial market projects, including sovereign refugee bonds and stock exchange company investment funds, that will enable frontline state capital markets to raise funds for their crisis response, employment, infrastructure, and development needs.
- Libra Group committed to continue providing monetary support, resources, and technologies to nongovernmental organizations (NGO) working directly with refugees in Greece, and to extend its focus on education, mental health and security for unaccompanied minors and women. Activities will include purchase and installation of security cameras; hiring and deployment of mental health professionals; and provision of funds, shelter, and educational scholarships for unaccompanied minors and woman entering Greece.
- LinkedIn committed to growing its refugee initiative, Welcoming Talent, to additional countries beyond Sweden. LinkedIn is taking a different strategy in expanding to Canada by integrating LinkedIn training curriculum into economic empowerment and employment programs, in collaboration with the Prime Minister's office and two local NGOs, and scaling this approach with the IRC to expand in global markets.
- Lynke pledged to open a second tech center in Jordan by the end of 2017, expanding on their partnership with Microsoft, MasterCard, HP, UNHCR, Coursera, and others to replicate their facilities in a second economic zone. This will double the number of refugee employees building apps or conducting outsourcing work for Lynke's partners, and double the number of graduates for partners to hire.
- MasterCard pledged to expand the reach of its MasterCard Aid Network, humanitarian prepaid, and remittance services, to 2 million aid recipients; to mobilize and partner with other private and public sector organizations to build “smart communities” that seek to integrate refugee populations; to assist refugee-serving organizations with information safety and security workshops and guidance; and to convene a multisector working session to determine how refugees can more easily access financial services.
- McKinsey & Co. pledged to conduct and publish new research, which will seek to understand the root causes, economic, social, and environmental impacts of migration and to develop a toolkit for policymakers, executives, and social leaders; lead activities to improve education for Syrian refugee children in Lebanon; and partner with a leading international humanitarian organization to develop interventions to create meaningful job opportunities for Syrian refugees in Jordan.
- Microsoft pledged to build upon existing partnerships with the U.N. and NGOs such as UNHCR to invest in technology that provides refugees with broader access to education, professional skills, and economic opportunity. This includes support for UNHCR's Connectivity for Refugee initiative; donation of cloud technology services to NGOS engaged in refugee relief; expansion of an Arabic to German language training program; support for a 12-month counseling and psychosocial assistance program; and an Innovation Hub where refugees can develop technology and entrepreneurial skills.
- Newton Supply Co. pledged to increase the percentage of refugee-made products outsourced by Open Arms from 30 percent to 90 percent over the next 12 months, to employ more female refugees, and to focus their marketing efforts on raising awareness of their refugee‑made products.
- Not Impossible Labs pledged to establish “maker labs” in refugee camps and settlements. These labs will be focused on innovative thinking and “maker” skill sets, and will provide refugee youth with tools, trainings, and skills-building workshops to develop breakthrough solutions to local needs and challenges. Not impossible plans to launch the inaugural lab in Q4 of 2016.
- Nova Credit Inc. is building the world's first cross-border credit reporting agency, enabling immigrants to access their credit. Nova pledges to prioritize and develop data partnerships with countries that have a high refugee population in the United States, including Iran, Bhutan, and countries in Sub-Saharan Africa. Many of these nations have limited financial infrastructure and the company pledges to pursue alternative data partnerships to help drive financial inclusion for these populations in need.
- Oliver Wyman pledged to recruit qualified refugees in Europe; use their partner network to explore solutions for enhancing entrepreneurial activities and developing job-related skills for refugees; raise the issue of providing employment with clients; and provide a central website where clients can access information on organizations that can help them support refugees.
- Pearson pledged to extend its partnership with Every Child Learning for an additional two years and double its $2.2 million investment to develop and provide quality educational products for Syrian refugees and vulnerable Jordanian children.
- PIMCO pledged to host a panel discussion on September 20, titled: the Frontlines of the Global Refugee Crisis: Human Flight Beyond Comparison and invite a panel of experts to speak to the broader PIMCO population about refugees’ emergency needs, the legal assistance refugees’ seek, and resettlement efforts more broadly. PIMCO will then form action teams in each PIMCO office to dig in, identify needs and nonprofit partners, and give time and financial resources to determine the best way to support the crisis.
- SAP pledged to educate 10,000 refugee youth across 4 nations with coding skills during our inaugural “Refugee Code Week,” Oct. 15-23, 2016; to address the education shortage in the refugee population by creating a full life cycle of skills support for young people in refugee camps; to empower adults and youth with critical, job-relevant coding tools and skills; to create computer literacy by introducing young refugees to coding basics through playful workshops; and to facilitate the integration of coding education within school curriculums of the hosting nations.
- Singhal & Co. pledged to offer corporate internships to two refugees a year until 2020; donate up to $10,000 a year in educational scholarships for refugees until 2020; and provide $20,000 in funding toward assisting refugees through the U.S. Committee for Refugees and Immigrants until 2020.
- SkillSmart is pledging to provide their skills matching and skills capacity building platform to refugee resettlement agencies to allow refugees to connect to available jobs as well as to tailored training courses.
- Soros Fund Management pledged to invest up to $500 million in companies leveraging their resources and ingenuity to aid refugees worldwide, doubling down on the premise that the private sector can lead global change. These investments will target startups, established companies, and social impact initiatives, including businesses started by refugees themselves. While investments will cross a variety of sectors, Soros sees particular potential for emerging digital technologies to help refugees gain access more efficiently to government, legal, financial, and health services, thereby improving the quality of life of millions around the world.
- Sparrow Mobile commits to expand its RefugeeMobile program from 250 families (est. 700 individuals) to 1,000 or more families (est. 2,800 individuals) by 2018; to expand to another geographic region; and to target at least 50 percent women as primary smartphone recipients.
- Synthesis Corp. planned to identify and work with refugee entrepreneurs in the Northeast United States to develop an innovation hub for refugees seeking to either launch or grow an ongoing business. The hub will serve as a clearinghouse for materials and will seek to develop an ecosystem of mentors, funders, and cross-business activity.
- Tetra Tech committed to hire one locally based qualified refugees as a paid intern for at least 2 months over the course of 2017; to host one mock interview workshop that includes refugee jobseekers; and to interview qualified refugees for any vacancies listed during 2017 in the San Francisco and Washington, D.C. offices.
- TransparentBusiness pledges to donate $1 million in TransparentBusiness.com technology for U.S. companies, including those who have answered the Call to Action, to use for hiring and managing qualified refugees remotely.
- TripAdvisor will commit at least $5 million, over the next three years, from the TripAdvisor Charitable Foundation to aid the humanitarian refugee crisis, expanding its partnerships with the International Rescue Committee and Mercy Corps, and through providing in-kind support through its TripAdvisor Media Group.
- Twilio pledged to offer credits and discounts for refugee-serving organizations to access Twilio's communication platform; to launch a Call-to-Action campaign to recruit and deploy developers to provide pro-bono support to refugee-serving organizations; and to donate an additional product donation, cash grant, and dedicated developer team to a leading NGO.
- Twitter pledged to support NGOs that directly assist refugees with an “Ads for Good” advertising grant of $50,000, and to provide best practices trainings to refugee-serving organizations in Europe and the United States.
- Uber pledged to work with U.S. resettlement agencies to provide independent work opportunities to refugees through its platform and connect potential refugee drivers with affordable, low-risk leases and auto discounts. Uber also pledges to support local organizations that provide critical goods and services to refugee families through the Uber GIVING donation campaign.
- Udemy pledged to leverage the Udemy platform and audience to create economic empowerment opportunities by onboarding refugees as course instructors, and to deliver educational content to displaced people to help them qualify for market-relevant jobs.
- UPS pledged to leverage funding, expertise, company resources, and UPS volunteers to expand its partnerships with UNHCR, UNICER, WFP, Care, the Salvation Army, and others, investing up to an additional $1 million to provide relief to refugee communities and support to displaced people around the world.
- Western Union pledged to support economic opportunities for refugees and displaced persons over the next three years through a new company-wide global initiative. Specifically, Western Union will help expand educational opportunities for refugee children and youth; provide refugees with internships, freelance and traditional employment opportunities at Western Union and with key corporate partners; and leverage Western Union's core assets – including its financial technology and global network of 35 million members to support refugee crisis response initiatives and shift the global conversation about refugees to one of economic opportunity.
- Zynga pledged to work proactively with resettlement agencies globally to make Words with Friends EDU, the educational version of Words with Friends, focused on teaching English academic vocabulary, readily and freely available to displaced people who are looking to develop their English language skills. Zynga will also provide three Expert Advisors to mentor the finalists of the EduApp4Syria competition, an international innovation competition to develop an open source smartphone application that can help Syrian children learn how to read in Arabic.
