= Abdulaziz bin Talal Al Saud =

Saudi Arabian prince (born 1982)

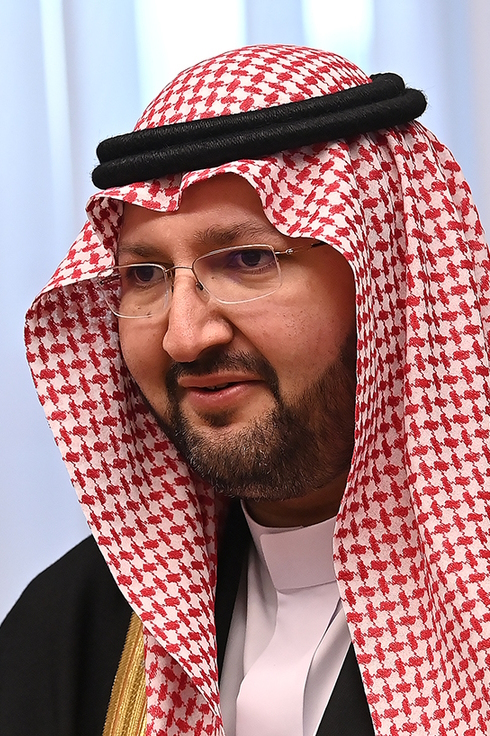
- Born: 7 September 1982 (age 43); Riyadh
- Spouse: Princess Sora bint Saud bin Abdullah Al Saud
- House: Al Saud
- Father: Talal bin Abdulaziz Al Saud
- Mother: Magdah bint Turki Al Sudairi

Abdulaziz bin Talal bin Abdulaziz Al Saud (born 1982) is a Saudi Arabian prince, one of the grandsons of Saudi Arabia's founder King Abdulaziz, and businessman. He is also the grandson-in-law as well as nephew of King Abdullah.

== Early life ==
Prince Abdulaziz bin Talal was born in Riyadh on 5 September 1982. He is the fifth son of Prince Talal and Magdah bint Turki Al Sudairi, the daughter of Turki bin Khaled Al Sudairi, former President of the Saudi Human Rights Commission.

== Personal life ==
Prince Abdulaziz bin Talal is married to Princess Sora bint Saud Al Saud, co-founder of Sora by Loren Jewels and granddaughter of former Saudi king, King Abdullah bin Abdulaziz Al Saud.

== Positions and activities ==
- Founder & President of the Global Saudi Presence Co.
- Honorary President of the first WSITGC in the GCC
- Member of the NCUSAR International Advisory Committee
- Member of the Islamic Finance and The Global Economic Crisis Forum
- Member of the Concordia Summit Leadership Council
- Fmr. Chair of the Transpacific Broadcast Group
- Fmr. Chair of the Arab Open University Forum
- Shareholder of Island Expert PVT LTD (Maldives)
