= Libra Group =

International conglomerate

Libra Holdings Ltd
- Trade name: Libra Group
- Type: Private
- Predecessor: Lomar Shipping
- Founded: 2003
- Headquarters: New York City
- Number of locations: 60 countries
- Area served: North America; Central America; South America; Europe; Asia
- Key people: George Logothetis (Executive Chairman); Nicholas Logothetis (Executive Vice Chairman); Manos Kouligkas (COO)
- Services: Aerospace; Renewable energy Hospitality; Real estate Diversified investments Maritime
- Website: libra.com

Libra Group is a privately held international holding company operating in a variety of industries. Its 15 operating entities include businesses across six continents, in six sectors: aerospace, renewable energy, hospitality, real estate, maritime, and diversified investments.

Libra Group originated with a company founded by Michael Logothetis in 1976; a shipping company under the name of Lomar Shipping. To diversify, in 2003 Libra Group was established as its umbrella corporation, and in the mid-2000s it expanded into diverse industries. George Logothetis is the company's executive chairman, Nick Logothetis is Executive Vice Chairman, and Manos Kouligkas is COO. The company is privately owned by the Logothetis family.

== History ==
=== Lomar Shipping ===
Libra Group's predecessor company, Lomar Shipping, was founded by Michael Logothetis in London in 1976. Michael Logothetis's son George Logothetis joined Lomar Shipping in 1993. In 1995, he became company CEO, enlarging Lomar's fleet from less than five to more than 55 ships during the subsequent decade.

=== Libra Group and diversification ===
In 2003, George Logothetis founded Libra Group, based in New York and London, in order to diversify and expand the shipping company into new business areas. George remains Libra Group's executive chairman.

At the time of the company's formation, international shipping was still its chief area of operations. Between 2004 and 2007, during a boom in the shipping business, Libra Group sold off most of Lomar's ships. With the profit from the ship sales, the new company purchased a fleet of airplanes, which were at a cyclical low, and set up an aircraft leasing division, Lease Corporation International (LCI), which leases aircraft to airlines such as British Airways and Virgin Atlantic. Libra Group repeated this successful "buy-low, sell-high" formula of going counter to prevailing market trends several times in the ensuing decade, building a large diversified multinational organization out of the former small shipping company. Each of the company's new ventures was headed by existing top personnel or close associates.

=== Expansion ===
In 2006, Libra Group started expanding beyond aviation. Its new major ventures included real estate, hospitality, and renewable energy.

In December 2009, after ship values slumped in the wake of the financial crisis, Libra Group re-entered the shipping business and purchased Allocean and its fleet of 26 ships. From December 2009 through December 2013, the company purchased a total of 73 ships.

In 2009, the company also re-entered the aircraft leasing market when LCI purchased a new fleet of aircraft. In 2012, LCI expanded operations to include helicopter leasing as well.

Libra Group has also expanded beyond its core businesses of shipping, aircraft leasing, real estate, hospitality, and renewable energy, to include a variety of interests including media, home furnishing, and financial services. Between 2008 and 2014, the company purchased $7 billion to $7.5 billion of assets globally. As of 2026, the company has 15 operating entities in nearly 60 countries around the world.

== Industry sectors and subsidiaries ==
=== Maritime ===
Lomar Shipping, the original predecessor to Libra Group, is a Libra maritime subsidiary. Between 2004 and 2007, at the height of a boom in the shipping business, Libra Group sold Lomar's fleet of nearly 70 ships. The company made a substantial profit from sales, which occurred before the 2008 financial crisis.

In December 2009, after ship values had slumped from the recession, Lomar purchased a new fleet and returned to the shipping sector, investing $1.4 billion in 91 vessels – mainly container ships – between 2009 and late 2014. As of late 2013, Lomar operated a fleet of nearly 60 ships, including bulk carriers, reefer ships, container ships, offshore support vessels, liquefied petroleum gas tankers, chemical tankers, platform supply vessels, anchor handling tug supply vessels, and product tankers.

In 2014, Lomar sold its entire fleet of six offshore support vessels for approximately $100 million, just before oil prices crashed; during this period the company sold additional vessels as well for another $100 million. Lomar purchased six container ships and two product tankers in December 2014, and seven more container ships in February 2015. As of 2017, Lomar had a total fleet of over 80 vessels. Lomar recorded close to 2 billion in vessel sales during July 2020 to June 2023.

Lomar acquired 166-year-old Carl Büttner Holding's chemical tanker fleet for $160 million in October 2022.

In 2024, Libra's Lomar Shipping exited the container sector after selling close to 100 vessels for more than $2 billion between 2020 and early June 2024. As of 2024, Lomar has approximately 30 vessels including tankers and bulk carriers.

Americraft Marine, a Libra subsidiary, acquired St. Johns Ship Building in Florida in 2022 to build and service Jones Act-compliant fleets. The shipyard builds aluminum vessels, including crew transfer vessels (CTVs) used to service the offshore wind farm industry.

Lomarlabs was launched in March 2023 to explore adaptive maritime technologies such as carbon capture devices, robotics, and removable wind sails. The same year Lomarlabs announced a collaboration with Seabound, a maritime emissions reduction and carbon capture start-up. In September 2023 a new Libra Group maritime subsidiary, Seapath, formed a joint venture with Pilot LNG to develop the first dedicated LNG bunkering facility in U.S. Gulf Coast. In March 2024 Seapath launched a maritime leasing business focused on Jones Act-compliant vessels with $25 Million in initial transactions.

In January 2024, Americraft delivered the WINDEA Courageous, the first of 3 Jones Act-compliant Incat Crowther crew transport vessels (CTV) ordered by WINDEA CTV LLC.

=== Aerospace ===
Lease Corporation International (LCI), Libra Group's former aircraft leasing subsidiary, was founded in 2004. LCI offices are located in Ireland, the United Kingdom, and Singapore. Since its inception, LCI has undertaken approximately $10 billion of transactions in the aviation market. It leases fixed-wing aircraft to airlines in Europe and Asia, including Singapore Airlines, British Airways, Virgin Atlantic, Oman Air, and Hong Kong Express Airways. After selling its fleet of aircraft in 2007, LCI purchased new aircraft in 2009.

In 2012, LCI expanded into helicopter leasing. In 2014, LCI purchased nearly $1 billion in helicopters from Airbus and AgustaWestland; in early 2015 it added 11 more helicopters from AgustaWestland. Helicopters leased by LCI are used for offshore oil operations, for commercial and governmental use, and for search and rescue as well as emergency medical services. Its lease clients in early 2015 included Westpac Rescue Helicopter Service and Australian Helicopters in Australia, and HeliService International in Germany.

In February 2024, LCI announced a commitment to acquire up to 21 more rotorcraft from Leonardo Helicopters under a new framework agreement.

Sumitomo Mitsui Finance and Leasing Company (SMFL) acquired a 35% stake in LCI from Libra Group in March 2023. In January 2023, LCI signed an agreement with Elroy Air, developer of advanced autonomous cargo aircraft systems, to acquire up to 40 of the company's Chaparral vertical take-off and landing (VTOL) aircraft. In April 2022, LCI signed an agreement with BETA Technologies to acquire up to 125 of the company's electric vertical take-off and landing (eVTOL) aircraft.

In January 2024 LCI launched LCI Analytics, a new research and advisory division focused on consultancy and research services for critical rotorcraft and advanced air mobility operations.

In February 2026, Libra Group announced the sale of its remaining shares in aviation lessor, LCI, to Sumitomo Mitsui Finance and Leasing Co., Ltd. (SMFL).

Libra Group announced its project to become the first space leasing company in June 2023, offering satellites, spaceports and various infrastructure elements through a new subsidiary, Space Leasing International (SLI). Since its founding, SLI has expanded its portfolio to include traditional aviation and advanced air mobility assets

In November 2023 SLI acquired a satellite ground station in Alaska, the second of over 20 ground stations to be leased by SLI to RBC Signals.

=== Hotels and hospitality ===
Libra Group has several hotel subsidiaries, which operate luxury hotels worldwide. The company established Grace Hotels, an international luxury-hotel management company that began in Greece. In 2018 Auberge Resorts Collection took over management of the Grace hotels with Libra Group taking a strategic interest in Auberge. The hotel chain's first location, Grace Mykonos, received the highest award at the 2007 European Hotel Design Awards. The Grace Santorini was in Condé Nast Traveler's Gold List in 2012, and the Vanderbilt Grace in Newport, Rhode Island was listed in Tatler's top 14 hotels in the U.S. in 2015.

Other hotel companies owned by Libra Group, which has a portfolio of 70 properties, include Aria Hotels in Greece. Elandis develops, owns, and manages real estate, that has included hotels and hospitality properties. In 2016 it opened the first Hyatt Place hotel in Brazil.

=== Renewable energy ===
Libra Group owns three renewable-energy subsidiaries with a total footprint and pipeline of around 7GW. EuroEnergy, based in Greece, operates solar and wind energy plants. Greenwood Energy develops and manages on-site solar energy systems for public and private sector organizations wishing to offset their energy costs in Latin America. Greenwood also had a solar-power engineering, procurement, and construction division, called Greenwood Biosar. In 2014 Greenwood Biosar built Panama's first utility-scale solar power plant. Convergen Energy Latvia develops sustainable power sources and renewable energy in the Latvian market. In July 2024, Libra Group announced the consolidation of Convergen Latvia into EuroEnergy.

In April 2022 Latin American subsidiary Greenwood Energy, together with the Confederación Indígena Tayrona (CIT), the organization of indigenous peoples of northwestern Colombia, launched the Terra Initiative, a utility-scale solar project in Colombia's Sierra Nevada de Santa Marta mountains. In 2023 EuroEnergy acquired a 114-megawatt wind energy development in Udbina, Croatia for €150 million, and announced its partnership with Afcon Renewable Energy to invest in renewable energy across Poland, increasing the company's European project portfolio to more than 400MW.

In April 2023 GSI, the group's North American renewable energy subsidiary, acquired Ontario, Canada-based renewable energy developer Saturn Power's 1.4GW solar and energy storage projects located across five states in the U.S. and two Canadian provinces.

In January 2024, Iyuhána Solar, a partnership led by GSI alongside the Ocean Man First Nation community, was awarded a contract by regional Canadian utility SaskPower to build and operate a 100MW solar PV facility.

=== Real estate ===
Libra Group's real estate subsidiaries are involved in the development and management of residential, retail, commercial, and hospitality properties worldwide. The company formerly operated a real estate brokerage, management, and consulting services firm, Singapore Residential. It also owned First Oriental, which was involved in real estate development in Southeast Asia. In Greece, Libra Group has owned a Sotheby's International Realty brokerage. Other real estate subsidiaries include Elandis and investor and management company FCA Group in Panama. In September 2020, real estate subsidiary Elandis announced a joint venture between Libra Group and international asset manager M&G Investments for multifamily properties in the U.S. Grace Hotel Santorini is owned by Libra Group's Athens and Madrid-based real estate subsidiary Sparta. Sparta also owns a portfolio of hotels in New England, USA.

Libra Group previously held a strategic interest in Argentina-based real estate investment and development company, Amerisud. The company previously developed Optima Business Park in three phases and a residential complex, Beccar Plaza, both in Buenos Aires.

=== Diversified investments ===
Libra previously held LXM Group, a financial services provider, and Riposte Capital.

Libra Group has 15 operating entities around the world. Its diversified companies, which fall outside of its main areas of operation, include Principal Media, a film and television company based in Los Angeles, which, in November 2022, invested in Toronto-based TV and film production company, Chesler/Perlmutter Productions. Libra Group also has a 50% stake in the luxury natural-fiber mattress and home furnishings company COCO-MAT. In March 2022 Libra Group announced an investment in GreenMet, formerly known as Greentech Minerals Holdings. The company is active in the development of sustainable supply chain infrastructure for critical rare earth minerals, such as green steel. In November 2025, Libra Group announced the sale of its stake in GreenMet. Following the sale, Libra Group has reinvested into a sustainable lithium extraction and processing project based in Texas and Arkansas.

== Corporate affairs ==
=== Operations ===
Libra Group's headquarters are located in New York. The company has offices in 30 regions worldwide, including locations in Miami, Beijing, Buenos Aires, and Athens.

As of 2026, the company has 15 operating entities around the world. The major subsidiaries operate in six separate industries: Aerospace; renewable energy; hotels and hospitality services; real estate; maritime and diversified investments.

Several of Libra Group's past subsidiaries were responsible for the management and oversight of subsidiaries within a specific geographic region. Some of these included First Mediterranean Investments, a holding company for specialist investment companies focused on the Southeastern Mediterranean and Balkan regions; and First Oriental Investments, was a specialist real estate investment and development company for Southeast Asia. Libra Group also operates Libra Capital and Libra Group Services, providing investment-management and legal, accounting, marketing, and administrative services to other Libra Group subsidiaries.

=== Leadership ===
Libra Group is privately owned by the Logothetis family, whose members fill several key roles in the organization. George Logothetis is the company's executive chairman and founding CEO, appointing Manos Kouligkas to succeed him as CEO in 2022. Nicholas Logothetis is the executive vice-chairman. Constantine Logothetis is a non-executive board member and was formerly vice chairman. Adamantios Tomazos is the vice chairman, and was a founding director of Lease Corporation International, the international commercial aircraft leasing subsidiary of Libra Group. Former United States ambassador John Negroponte is a former director of Libra Group and an advisor to the board. Leon Logothetis is the former head of the company's Los Angeles–based film company Principal Media.

=== Philanthropies ===
In 2011, Libra Social Responsibility was formed. In September 2023, it was spun off into Libra Philanthropies, the sister organization of Libra Group and an independent 501c3. Libra Philanthropies is involved in several education, mentorship, and social projects. In partnership with the American College of Greece and the Greek America Foundation, the company established an internship program in 2011 to facilitate study abroad and work-experience programs for Greek and Greek-American students. In 2012, the company pledged €5 million to create the Hellenic Initiative's Hellenic Entrepreneurship Award, which provides mentorship and funding to Greek entrepreneurs; as of 2017, Libra Group has committed €10 million to supporting entrepreneurship in Greece through the award. The company also launched the American Entrepreneurship Award, for U.S. communities facing a disproportionate lack of opportunity – initially Bronx, New York and Miami-Dade County, Florida – in 2016.

Some of its other programs include the Seleni Institute for women's maternal physical and mental health, and the HOME Project which aids refugees and provides safe shelters for unaccompanied refugee children.

Libra Group is a founding sponsor of the My Brother's Keeper (MBK) Alliance, launched in May 2015 by President Obama. The MBK Alliance helps young men of color throughout the U.S. reach their full potential, by ensuring and improving educational and workplace opportunities. As part of its involvement with the original My Brother's Keeper Initiative launched by Obama in February 2014, Libra Group has partnered with Leadership Enterprise for a Diverse America (LEDA) by providing internship placements for young men of color at Libra and its global subsidiaries. In 2016 the company pledged funds, services, and resources to the Obama administration's Partnership for Refugees to aid the global refugee crisis. It also signed the Obama administration's Equal Pay Pledge to pay women commensurately with men and eliminate gender-based hiring bias.

In September 2023, the Logothetis family launched Libra Philanthropies. Libra Philanthropies is a fully independent sister organization of Libra Group that was launched by the Logothetis family as a 501(c)(3) foundation. It comprises 10 philanthropic initiatives.
