= Seleni Institute =

- Formation: 2011
- Founder: Nitzia Logothetis; George Logothetis
- Founded at: Manhattan, New York
- Type: Women's health, maternal health, women's mental health
- Services: Health care, counseling, support groups, training
- Website: seleni.org

The Seleni Institute is a non-profit organization dedicated to women's physical and mental health, focusing on enhancing the quality of maternal and reproductive mental health. Founded in 2011 by psychotherapist Nitzia Logothetis and her husband George Logothetis, it is headquartered in Manhattan, New York. The institute provides health care, information, support groups, and workshops to women, men and families during the family-building years. The institute also trains mental health professionals in Perinatal Mood & Anxiety Disorders (PMADs) and Perinatal Loss & Grief.

According to the institute's website, its aim is "to destigmatize and transform mental health and wellness by addressing real-life issues that challenge the emotional health of women, men, and their families, including: pre-pregnancy, pregnancy, infertility/third-party reproduction, miscarriage, stillbirth, menopause, parenting, and child loss." Its activities include treating patients; training professionals such as psychologists, therapists, OB/GYNs, pediatricians, nurses, and midwives; providing public programs such as new-parent groups, parenting workshops, and adolescent services; and advocating in public and private sectors.

In 2014, the Institute inaugurated the Seleni Research Award to fund research on perinatal mood and anxiety disorders, and the following year the same grant was given out in collaboration with the David Lynch Foundation. In 2015, the institution began extending services to pregnant and post-partum teenage girls.

== History ==
The Seleni Institute was founded as a nonprofit institution by psychotherapist Nitzia Logothetis and her husband George Logothetis in 2011. The name was chosen as a portmanteau of the Greek goddess Selene, who is associated with women, emotions, and serenity, and the main character in the book Eleni, who in the Greek Civil War fought for her children to escape to America. The institute's headquarters opened in Manhattan, New York.

The Seleni Institute focuses on women's maternal and reproductive mental health, providing direct care to women, men and families during the family-building years. The organization also provides services such as grief counseling, parenting workshops, support groups for new mothers and young parents, and training for mental health professionals. The institute publishes free research material and accessible write-ups on health care issues on their website.

In February 2014, the Seleni Institute was awarded the Archbishop Iakovos Leadership 100 Award for Excellence for "innovative work in creating a new modality for the treatment of women and their families." US Representative Nancy Pelosi officially visited and toured the institute in September 2014, and later that year, Laura Bush also visited. The Bal, a couture party held since 1992 at the Hôtel de Crillon, fundraised for the Seleni Institute in 2015.

The institute inaugurated the Seleni Research Award in 2014, which is an annual grant to fund research "on perinatal mood and anxiety disorders." The first grant went to Dr. Katharine Sharkey at Brown University to study the effects of sleep and light therapy on anxiety. The following year Seleni Institute partnered with the David Lynch Foundation on the same grant to create the Perinatal Mental Health Research Award, in support of research on transcendental meditation in treating perinatal anxiety.

Prior to 2015 the institute held small training sessions on postpartum depression; in January 2015 New York State instated new maternal-depression screening legislation, and the Seleni Institute subsequently trained 67 nurses, social workers, and health providers to identify the condition and learn about related services. In May 2015 the institute launched its Seleni Institute Teen Initiative (SITI), which extends "reproductive and maternal mental health services to pregnant and postpartum teenage girls." While most clients were seen through the center in Manhattan, Seleni clinicians also interact with clients over Skype.

In June 2015 the institute hosted the Seleni Congressional Luncheon in Washington, DC. During the event the institute presented Secretary of Health and Human Services Sylvia Burwell and Congresswoman Ileana Ros-Lehtinen with the Winnifred Mason Huck Leadership Award for their joint roles as mothers and as leaders in public service.

In December 2017 the institute launched the online version of its Maternal Mental Health Intensive Training for mental health professionals.

== Founders ==
Nitzia Logothetis is a psychotherapist. She has a psychology degree from Brown University, an MSc in child development from the University of London, and an MA in counseling for mental health and wellness from New York University's Steinhardt School of Culture, Education, and Human Development. Logothetis' brother Nicholas serves as a Board Director.

George Logothetis is the chairman and CEO of the Libra Group. Nitzia Logothetis (née Embiricos) and her husband George live in Manhattan, and have two sons and a daughter.

== See also ==
- Maternal health
- Pre-conception counseling
- Prenatal and perinatal psychology
