= Treets =

Brand of confectionery

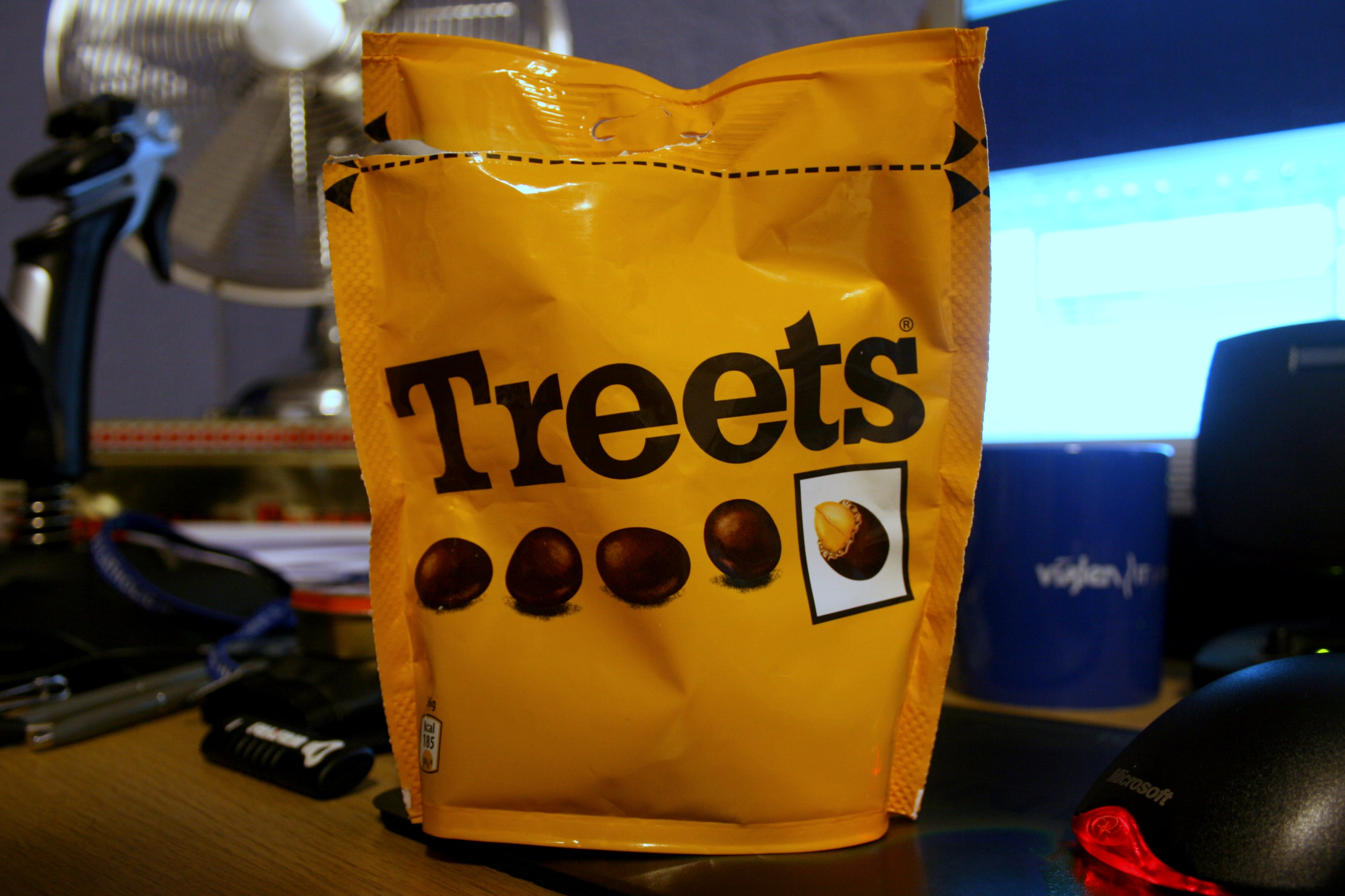
- Product type: Confectionery
- Introduced: 1960s; 65 years ago
- Related brands: Minstrels; M&M's
- Website: treets.eu

Treets were a brand of confectionery sold by Mars Limited in the United Kingdom, Italy, France, Germany, Belgium and the Netherlands.

The original product consisted of peanuts coated in milk chocolate with an outer shell of dark brown glazed candy, and appeared in the UK in the 1960s; these were later marketed as Peanut Treets (sold in a yellow packet), together with Toffee Treets (sold in a blue packet) and Chocolate Treets (sold in a brown packet). All three shared the same glazed coating, but the filling of the button-shaped Chocolate Treet consisted solely of the milk chocolate which surrounded the peanut or toffee pellet in the other versions. All three were marketed with the slogan "Melt in your mouth, not in your hand" which was first used in 1967 (used by Mars in the United States for M&Ms since 1949).

The brand was discontinued by Mars in 1988. Chocolate Treets had already been replaced with the similar Minstrels. Peanut Treets were discontinued in favour of the multi-coloured Peanut M&M's. Toffee Treets were later sold as Relays, before being dropped altogether.

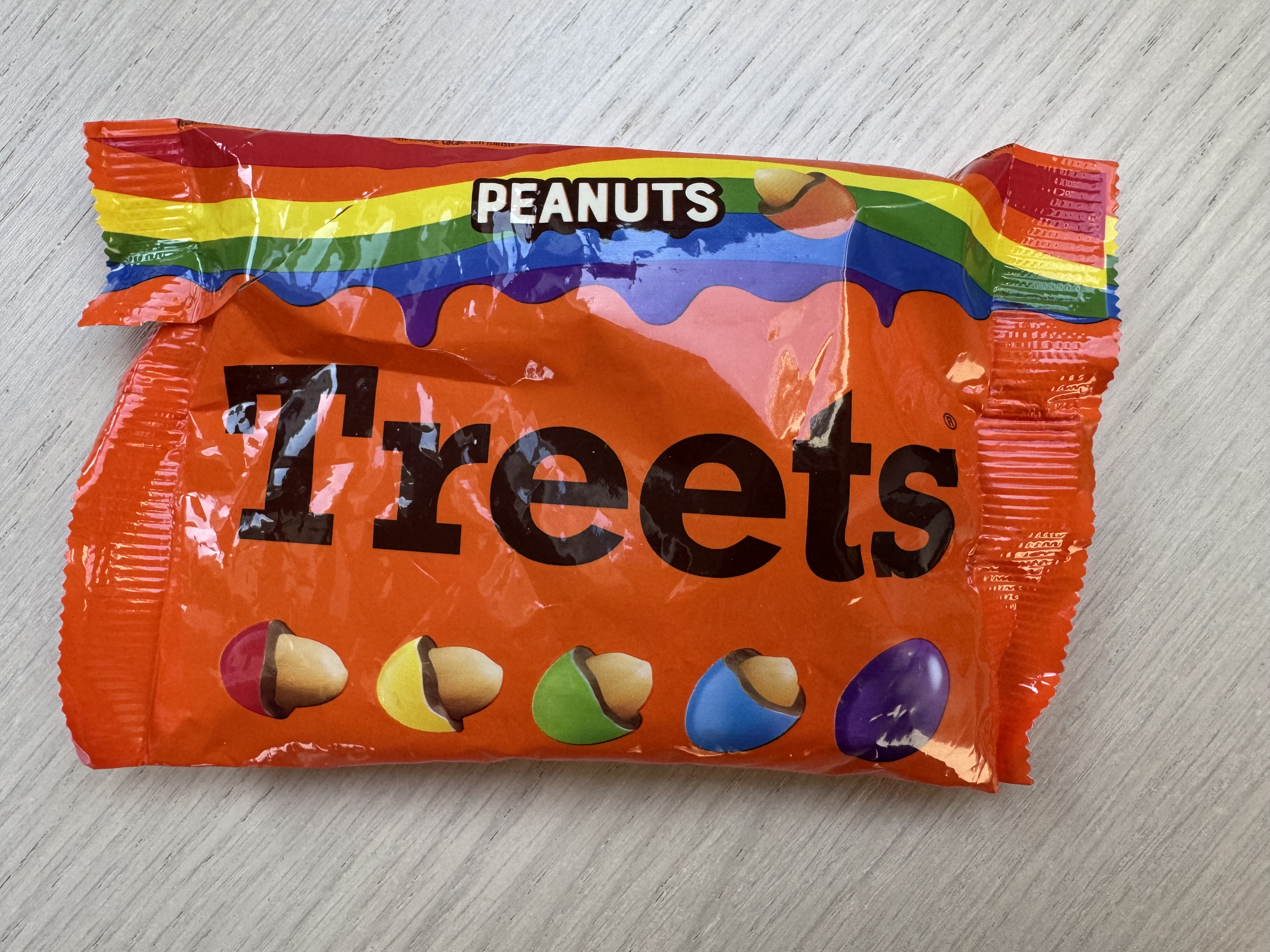
A pack of Treets from 2025

Mars briefly reintroduced the Peanut Treets brand in the UK in July 2009, but in 2017 Mars allowed its property rights to the brand to lapse; this allowed Lutti, a brand under Katjes International, to launch Treets in France in 2018. However, by the end of 2018, Treets was reported under the Piasten, a brand under Katjes International based in Germany. As of 2021, the range had expanded beyond the traditional candy coated shell product to include Peanut Caramel Choco and Sea Salt, Peanut Butter Caramel Bites, Peanut Butter Cups and jars of Creamy Peanut Butter and Choco Peanut Butter. In the UK, Treets are sold under the Candy Kittens brand, also part of the Katjes group. Instead of a chocolate coating, they use a sunflower seed based alternative from ChoViva. The UK range is made up of coated pretzel bites, rice bites, corn, and peanuts.
