= Dove Bar =

Ice cream

Dove Bar is an American ice cream bar, created by Leo Stefanos at Dove Candies & Ice Cream on 60th Street and Pulaski Avenue in Chicago in 1956 and introduced nationally in 1984. The brand, including Dove chocolate as well as the ice cream, was bought by Mars Inc. in 1986, and the Dove Bar today is made by Mars.

The bars are most commonly vanilla ice cream coated in milk or dark chocolate, but many other varieties are available, including chocolate ice cream, fruit sorbet, and coatings with nuts. The ice cream bars are sold either individually or in three-packs.

Dove ice cream is also sold in pints and "Minis". The pints have a layer of chocolate ganache on the top, containing an impression of the Dove logo.

U.S. production takes place in Burr Ridge, Illinois.

== See also ==
- Magnum (ice cream)
- Eskimo Pie
