= YoCrunch =

American Yogurt brand

- Product type: Dairy; Fermented milk products
- Current owner: YoFarm Yogurt Company (Danone)
- Country: United States
- Introduced: 1985
- Website: www.yocrunch.com

YoCrunch
- Variations: Various regular and promotional flavors

YoCrunch is an American brand of yogurt that is packaged together with crunchy mix-in toppings.

Their dome-topped cups come with yogurt flavors like strawberry, vanilla, and cookies n cream, and mix-ins like M&M's Chocolate Candies, Nestle Crunch candy, Reese's Pieces candy, Oreo cookie pieces, Butterfinger candy, and granola. YoCrunch introduced the YoCrunch Fruit Parfait line in 2010, and the YoCrunch Greek and Greek Parfait lines in 2011. In 2014, YoCrunch introduced the YOPA! line of miniature low-calorie Greek yogurts with M&M's and Dove (chocolate) chocolate toppings.

YoCrunch is currently sold across the United States in six-ounce (170 g) cups and 4-ounce multipacks. It is manufactured in Ft. Worth, Texas.

== Company history ==
Yofarm Corporation was founded in 1984 by Mr Josef Dansky. Mr Dansky had previously established several dairy product companies in both South Africa and Australia. On his arrival in the United States, he saw opportunities in the domestic yogurt and dessert market which Yofarm was established to fill.

One year later in 1985, Yofarm introduced its first product, the Jelly Cup (registered trademark). It was a single-serve, shelf-stable jelly dessert that became a pioneer within an emerging ready-to-eat dessert/snack category.

Soon after, Yofarm’s all-natural fruit yogurt was introduced in seven flavors. Over the years, it rolled out new products including Gala Puddings, Rice Puddings, YoCrunch, YoFruity and YoCholát.

In 1991, Yofarm was the first to introduce a yogurt and granola single-serve cup topping combination and, in doing so, created a whole new category in the dairy industry, the dairy toppings section.

The product was called YoCrunch (registered trademark), and it combined a low-fat version of the company’s mild, all-natural fruit yogurt with a packet of granola in a single-serve offering. It was well-received within the industry and it won the "Best New Product — Dairy" award at the Eastern Dairy, Deli, and Bakery (edda) Taste Show in 1992.

As an extension to YoCrunch, in 1994 YoCholát, with a chocolate crunch topping, was added to the range.

In 1997, Mr Dansky retired from the food industry and sold his company to Stolberg Partners.

For four years, from 2007 to 2011, YoCrunch was marketed by Breyers Yogurt Company as Breyers YoCrunch; however, YoCrunch ended this licensing agreement in January 2011.

Healthy Food Holdings, a portfolio company of private equity firm Catterton Partners held the YoCrunch Yogurt Company, LLC from 2005 to 2013.

The company was then sold to Groupe Danone in August 2013.
