= Graze (company) =

British snack company

Nature Delivered Limited
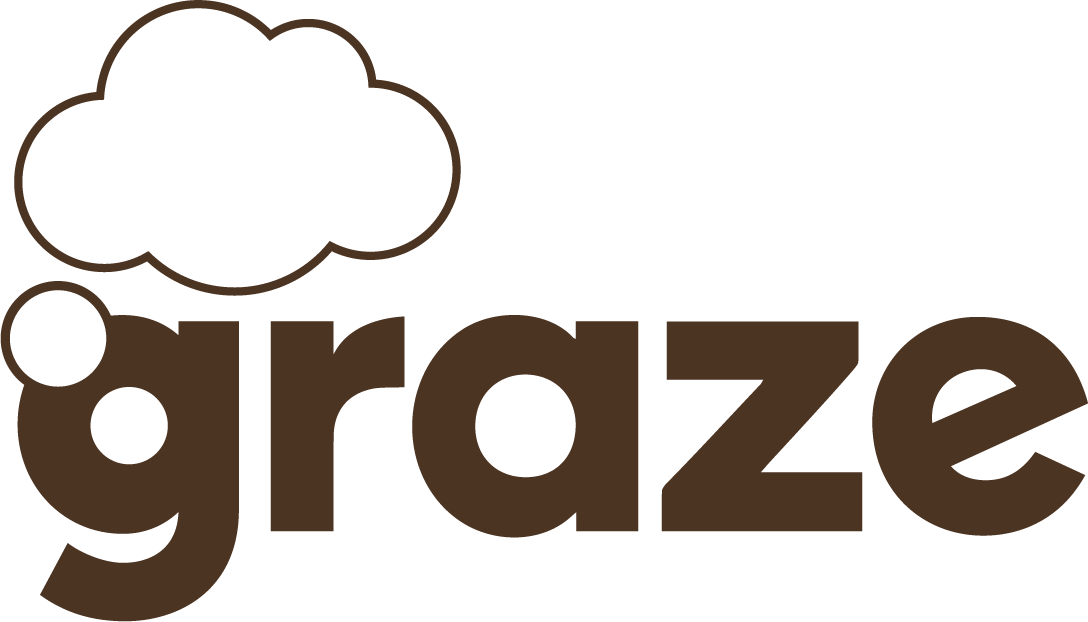
- Trade name: Graze
- Formerly: Gordons133 Limited (2007–2008)
- Industry: Food distribution; Food manufacturing
- Founded: 17 October 2007 in London, England
- Founder: Graham Bosher
- Headquarters: Kingston Upon Thames, Surrey, England
- Key people: Joanna Allen (CEO)
- Products: Subscription boxes; Healthy snacks
- Owner: Candy Kittens
- Number of employees: 500
- Parent: Nature Delivered Limited
- Website: graze.com

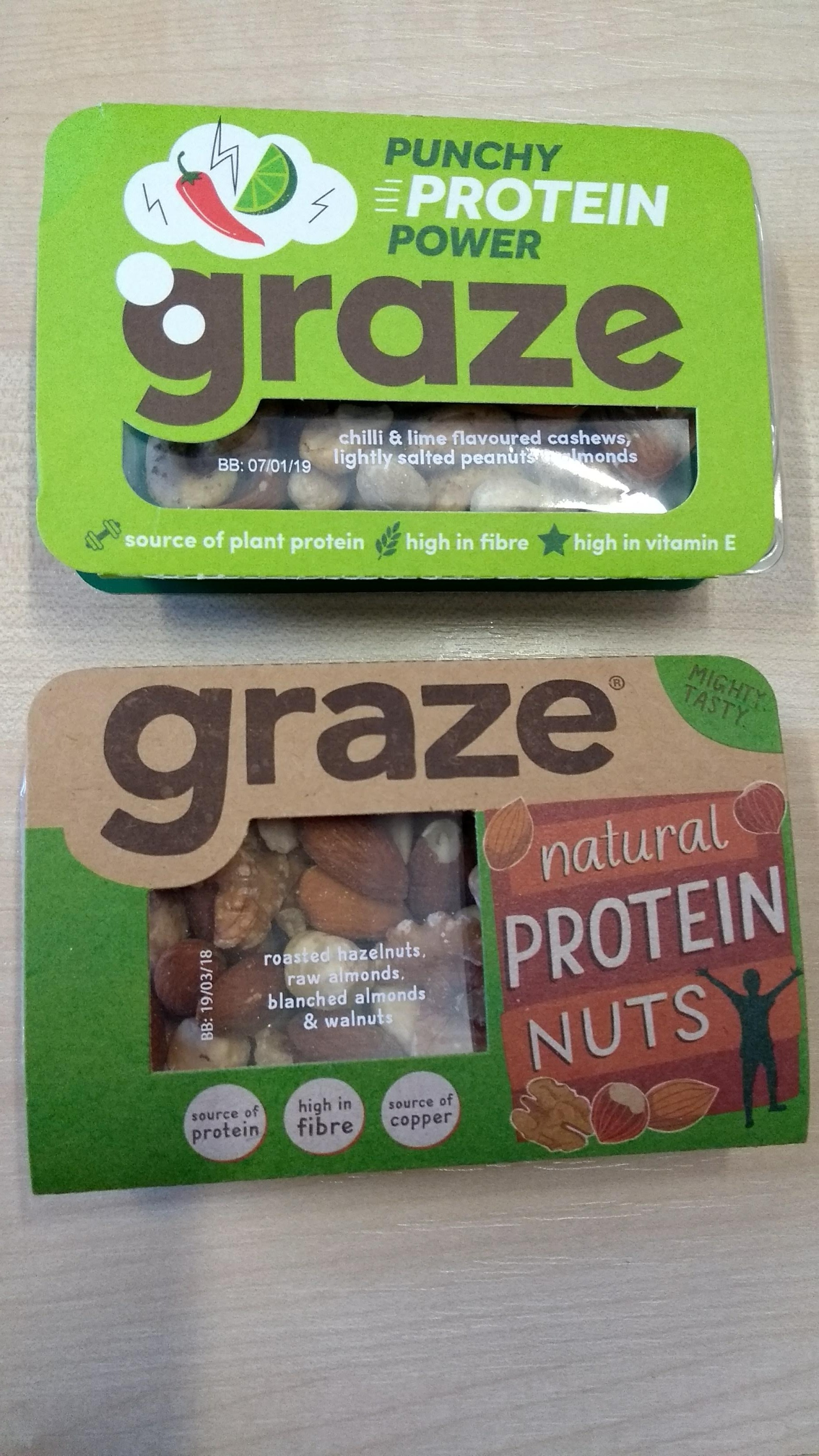
Graze snack boxes. The upper box is the 2018 redesign and the lower box is the pre-2018 design.

Nature Delivered Limited, trading as Graze (stylised as graze), is a United Kingdom-based snack company which is owned by Candy Kittens. Graze offers over 100 snack combinations through its online shop and retailers. The company launched as a subscription-based company and at one time distributed thousands of snack boxes per day across the UK. Its subscription service ended in 2024. Graze expanded operations to include the United States in 2013, launching snacks into US retailers in 2016.

Graze includes sweet and savoury snacks. Many of the products are suitable for vegans.

In December 2025 it was announced that Jamie Laing's Candy Kittens was set to acquire the business.

== History ==
Graze was launched in 2008 by seven friends brought together by Graham Bosher, the co-founder of LOVEFiLM, and backed by several key LOVEFiLM people. The company began delivering snacks including nuts, small puddings, and porridge across the United Kingdom. In November 2012, The Carlyle Group purchased the majority stake of Graze.

Graze opened a distribution center in New Jersey in January 2013 to begin beta trials in the United States. Graze officially expanded into the United States by late 2013 and has offices in Jersey City, New Jersey and Manhattan, New York. By the end of 2014, Graze had generated £68 million in revenue. In February 2017, Graze reported £75.8 million in revenue for the year. As of September 2017, Graze was available in 7,500 stores across the United States.

Graze announced the launch of a line of snack products to UK retailers including Sainsbury's, Boots UK, and WHSmith in July 2015.

In 2015, Graze was listed as a member of the Sunday Times Fast Track 100, the list of Britain's top 100 fastest growing companies.

In 2016, Graze launched an online shop for one-off purchases, outside the snack subscription model, and began selling a range of their snacks in Walgreens stores across the US.

In February 2019, Graze was acquired by Unilever for an undisclosed sum.

In August 2019, Graze subscribers in the US were notified that delivery on their subscriptions would end in September. As of September 2019, the Graze website store showed no products available for sale and no pending orders and by December 2019 it had reverted to a UK only website. The company has made no public announcement of why they have ceased business operations in the US.

In early 2024 they stopped their classic subscription box which fits through the letterbox and launched the new monthly subscription box in April 2024, containing 8 snacks but no longer tailored to individual preferences. However, the new boxes were stopped after 3 months and the company no longer offers a subscription service.

== Production ==
Graze used an algorithm called DARWIN (Decision Algorithm Rating What Ingredient's Next) to customise snack boxes based on the preferences subscribers entered on the site. Graze develops its own recipes that do not include genetically engineered ingredients, artificial flavours or colours, high fructose corn syrup, or trans fats. The old variety boxes contained four snacks and could be delivered weekly, biweekly, or monthly. Larger sharing bags and multipacks are available to buy ad-hoc on graze's online shop

Since 2023, graze has donated a portion of its profits to City Harvest, a London-based charity that redistributes surplus food to help tackle food poverty. Before this, graze supported the graze School of Farming in Uganda which helped over 400 families gain the skills and experience needed to feed and support themselves.
