= Sophie Habboo =

English television personality (born 1993)

- Habboo in 2023
- Born: 19 October 1993 (age 33); Warwickshire, England
- Education: Newcastle University
- Occupation: Television personality
- Years active: 2017–present
- Television: Made in Chelsea
- Spouse: Jamie Laing (m. 2023)
- Children: 1

Sophie Habboo (born 19 October 1993) is an English television personality and radio host, best known for appearing on the E4 series Made in Chelsea. She is also known for hosting the podcast Newlyweds with her husband, Jamie Laing.

== Early life ==
Habboo was born on 19 October 1993 and grew up in Leamington Spa. Her paternal grandfather is Iraqi; his family owned the Baghdad Hotel. She has a sister Georgia.

She graduated from Newcastle University in 2015 with a degree in Media, Communications and Cultural Studies.

== Career ==
In 2017, Habboo joined the cast of Made in Chelsea in the fourteenth series.

She began the podcast NearlyWeds with her then fiancée, Jamie Laing, after their engagement in 2021. It was later renamed to NewlyWeds and then NearlyParents.

Their documentary series Raising Chelsea aired on Disney+ in April 2026.

== Personal life ==
In December 2025, she and Jamie Laing welcomed their first child, a son named Ziggy.
