= Candy Kittens =

British confectionery company

Candy Kittens Limited
- Trade name: Candy Kittens
- Industry: Confectionery
- Founded: 20 January 2012
- Founder: Jamie Laing; Ed Williams
- Headquarters: Marylebone, London, England
- Brands: Graze
- Revenue: £14.9m (2024)
- Number of employees: 60
- Website: candykittens.co.uk

Candy Kittens is a British vegan confectionery company founded by Jamie Laing and Ed Williams in 2012. Candy Kittens is B Corp certified and produces vegan sweets made without gelatin. The company has signed deals with supermarkets including Selfridges, Tesco, Sainsbury's, Morrisons and Waitrose. Katjes International manufactures the sweets and holds a majority share in the business.

== History ==
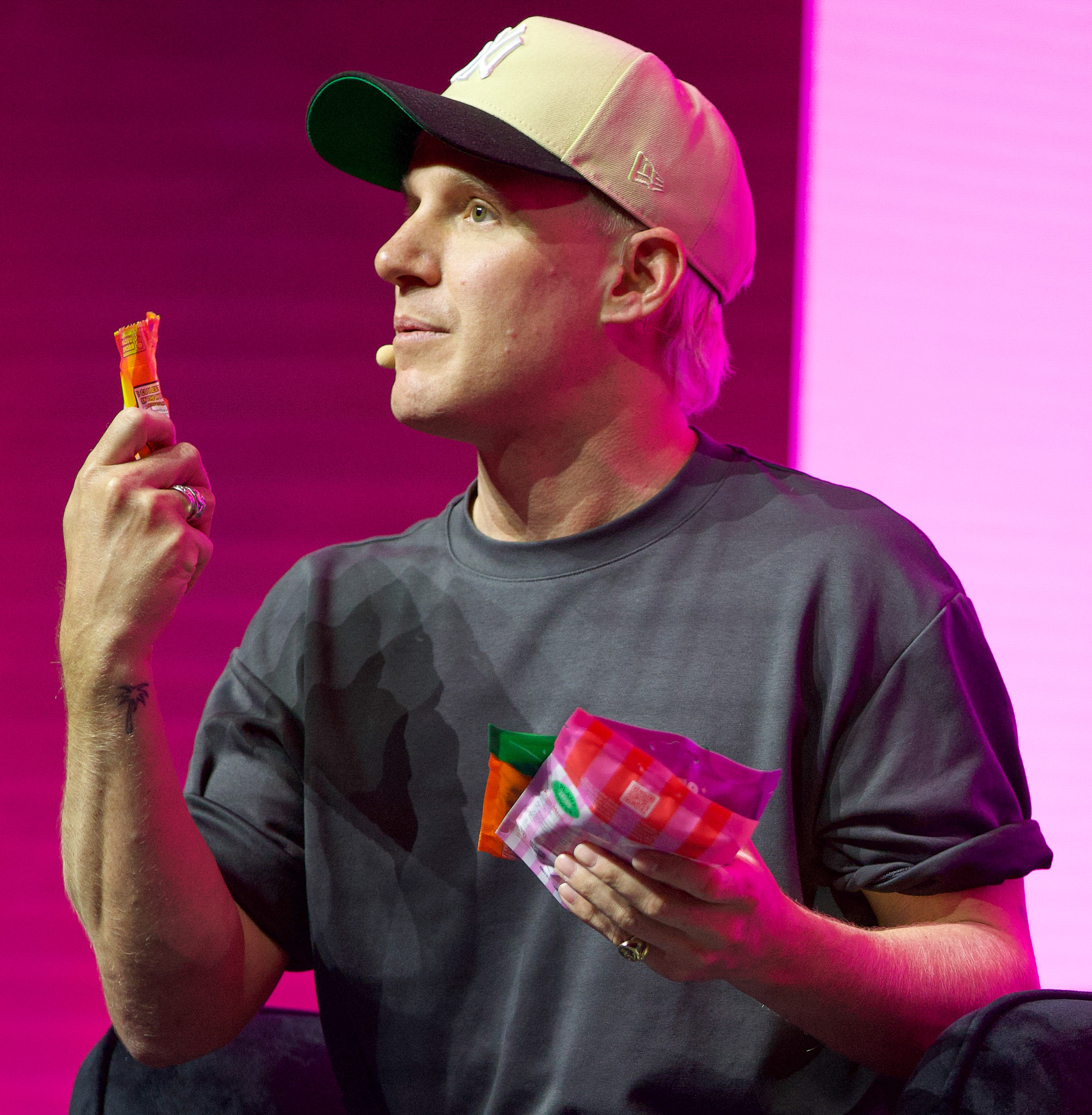
Laing in 2025, holding Candy Kittens packets

Candy Kittens was co-founded by television personality Jamie Laing and entrepreneur Ed Williams. They first met at an event in Loughborough in 2012, where Laing shared his aspiration of opening a sweet shop. Williams suggested that Laing should produce sweets instead, and the pair spent two years developing the product. This was partly funded by selling branded merchandise, leveraging Laing's social media following. Laing, a television personality known for Made in Chelsea, is the great-great-grandson of Sir Alexander Grant, 1st Baronet, who created the McVitie's digestive biscuit.

In 2022, Candy Kittens became the first sugar confectionary brand in the UK to be B Corp certified. The business acquired snacks brand Graze from Unilever in 2025. The founders also run Tuckshop London, an investment agency that has invested in chewing gum Nuud and Niko Omilana's brand Shades by Niko.

== Products ==
Tropical Mango flavoured sweet

Candy Kittens' products include their flagship sweets with flavours including Eton Mess, Tropical Mango and Wild Strawberry, alongside spin-offs such as "Smittens" and "Gourmies". Supermarket Aldi produced a knock-off version of Candy Kittens in 2020, but later apologised and stopped selling the sweets.

The company has collaborated with brands including BrewDog and Netflix, as well as mochi ice cream brand Little Moons. Candy Kittens also launched Treets (owned by majority stakeholder Katjes) in the UK in 2025, under the label "Candy Kittens Introduces".

== See also ==
- List of confectionery brands
- List of vegetarian and vegan companies
