= Galaxy (chocolate bar) =

Brand of chocolate

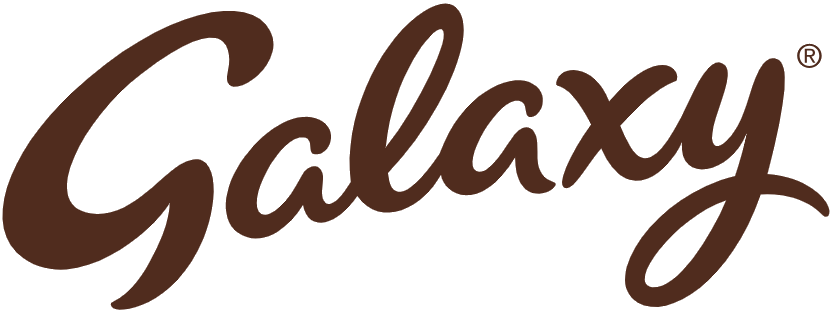

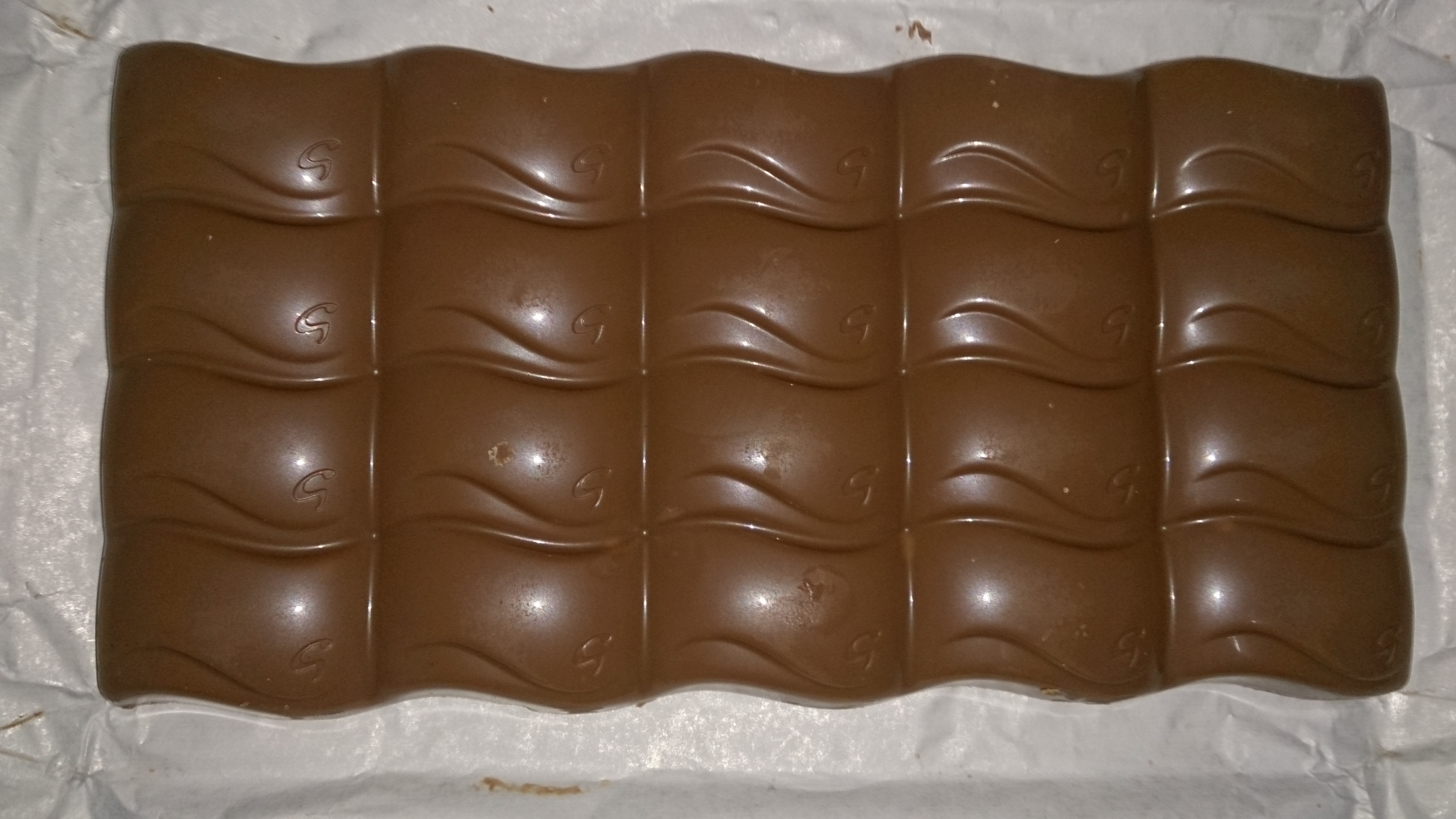
- Galaxy bubbles bar
- Product type: Chocolate
- Current owner: Mars, Incorporated
- Produced by: Mars, Incorporated
- Country: United Kingdom
- Introduced: 1960; 66 years ago
- Related brands: Dove
- Markets: United Kingdom
- Website: galaxychocolate.co.uk

Galaxy is a brand of chocolate products made and marketed by Mars Inc., and first manufactured in the United Kingdom in 1960. Galaxy is sold in the United Kingdom, Ireland, South Africa, the Middle East, Morocco, India, Pakistan, Australia, Malta, and is also sold in the United States, Canada, Mexico and various Continental European countries as Dove. In 2014, Galaxy was ranked the second-best-selling chocolate bar in the UK, after Cadbury Dairy Milk.

== Range ==
The Galaxy and Dove brands cover a wide range of products including chocolate bars in milk chocolate, caramel, Cookie Crumble, and Fruit & Nut varieties, Minstrels, Ripple (milk chocolate with a folded or "rippled" milk chocolate centre), Amicelli, Duetto, Promises, Bubbles and Truffle. Related brands in other parts of the world include "Jewels," and "Senzi" in the Middle East. The Galaxy and Dove brands also market a wide range of products including ready-to-drink chocolate milk, hot chocolate powder, chocolate cakes, ice cream and more.

A vegan Galaxy range launched in 2019. In 2023, the 110g Smooth Milk Galaxy bar sold in the UK was reduced in size to 100g without the price being reduced. It was described in the media as an example of a retail trend for "shrinkflation" during a period of higher inflation. Galaxy bars comes in multiple flavors including: smooth mint, caramel and cookie crumble.

=== Bubbles ===
Galaxy Bubbles
Nutritional value per 100 g (3.5 oz)
- Energy: 2,317 kJ (554 kcal)
- Carbohydrates: 54.7 g
- Sugars: 54.1 g
- Dietary fibre: 1.5 g
- Fat: 34.2 g
- Saturated: 20.4 g
- Protein: 6.5 g
Vitamins and minerals
Minerals	Quantity %DV^{†}
Sodium	5% 110 mg
- ^{†}Percentages estimated using US recommendations for adults.

Galaxy Bubbles is a chocolate bar made by Mars similar to a Cadburys Wispa or Nestlé Aero and was introduced in early 2010. The chocolate is like an ordinary Galaxy which has been aerated. The product also comes in an orange variety.

The standard version sold in stores is lighter compared to its competitors, at 31 g (1.1 oz) and consequently has a lower energy content, at 169 kcal (710 kJ), compared to the Wispa's 39 g (1.4 oz) and 210 kcal (880 kJ) or the Aero's 46 g (1.6 oz) and 220 kcal (920 kJ).

It is also available as a 100g 'block' or as a 28g milk chocolate egg (again with an aerated centre). The bar is suitable for vegetarians.

=== Honeycomb Crisp ===
Galaxy Honeycomb Crisp
Nutritional value per 100 g (3.5 oz)
- Energy: 2,282 kJ (545 kcal)
- Carbohydrates: 58.0 g
- Sugars: 57.2 g
- Dietary fibre: 1.6 g
- Fat: 32.0 g
- Saturated: 20.0 g
- Protein: 5.8 g
Vitamins and minerals
Minerals	Quantity %DV^{†}
Sodium	4% 100 mg
- ^{†}Percentages estimated using US recommendations for adults.

Galaxy Honeycomb Crisp is a chocolate bar made by Mars that contains small granular nougats of honeycomb toffee, as part of the Galaxy chocolate range.

== Marketing ==
A 2013 British television advertisement for Galaxy featured a computer-generated image of Audrey Hepburn, which was created by a CGI firm Framestore in London. The commercial, set to Hepburn singing "Moon River", debuted in the UK in February 2013.

Galaxy previously sponsored the British Book Awards.

== Gallery ==
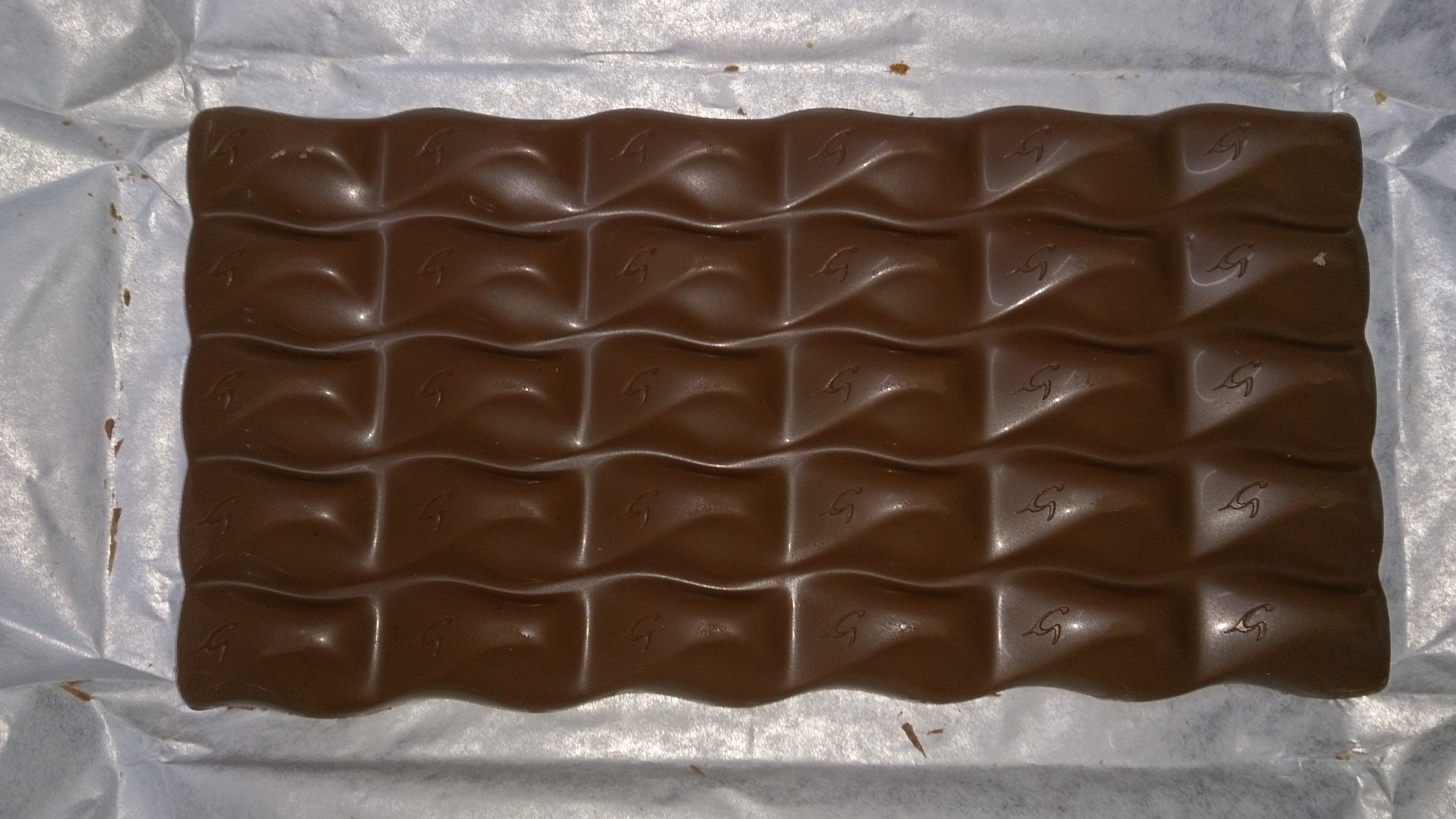
Topside of a large Galaxy Honeycomb Crisp bar

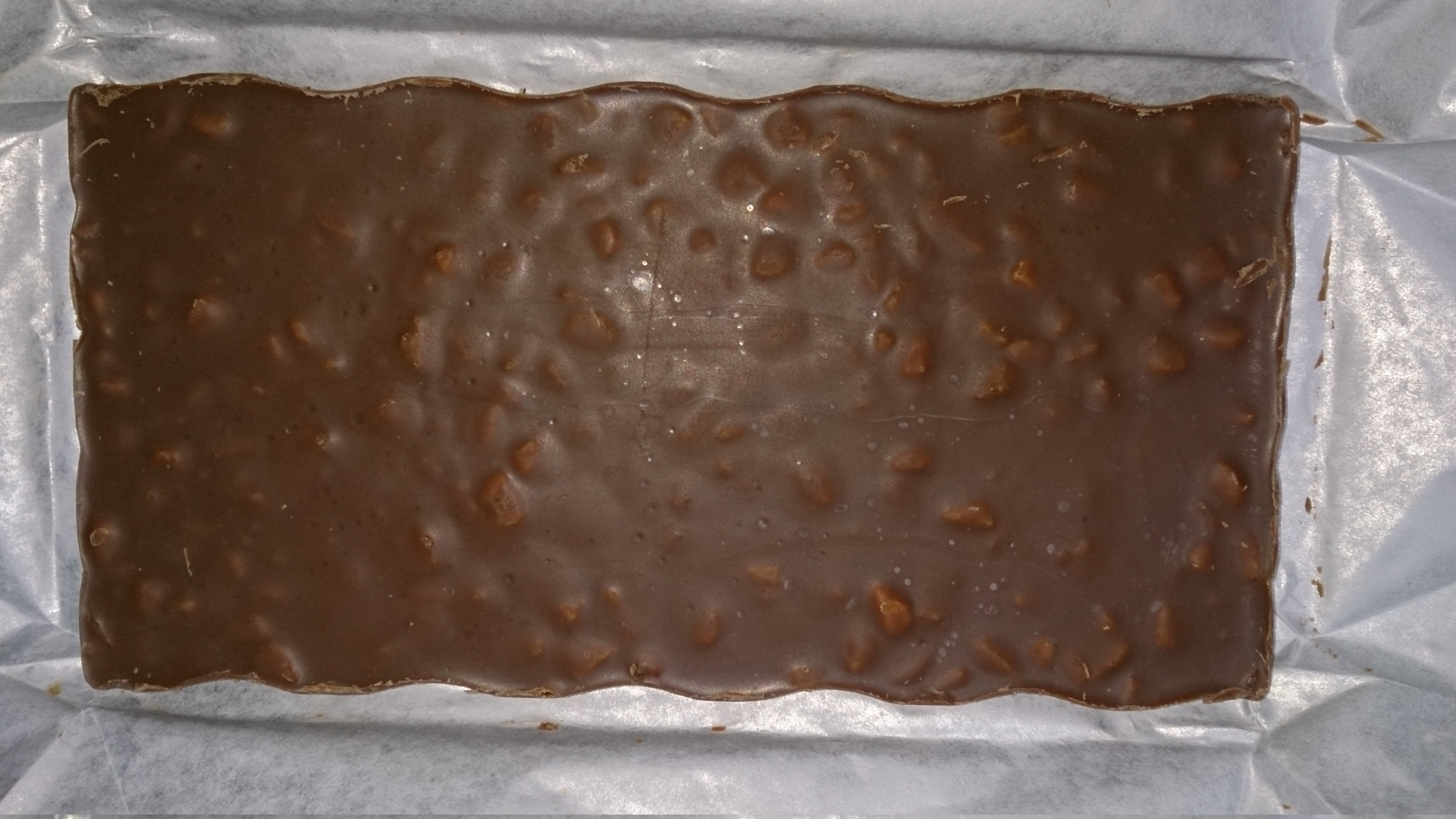
Underside of a large Galaxy Honeycomb Crisp bar

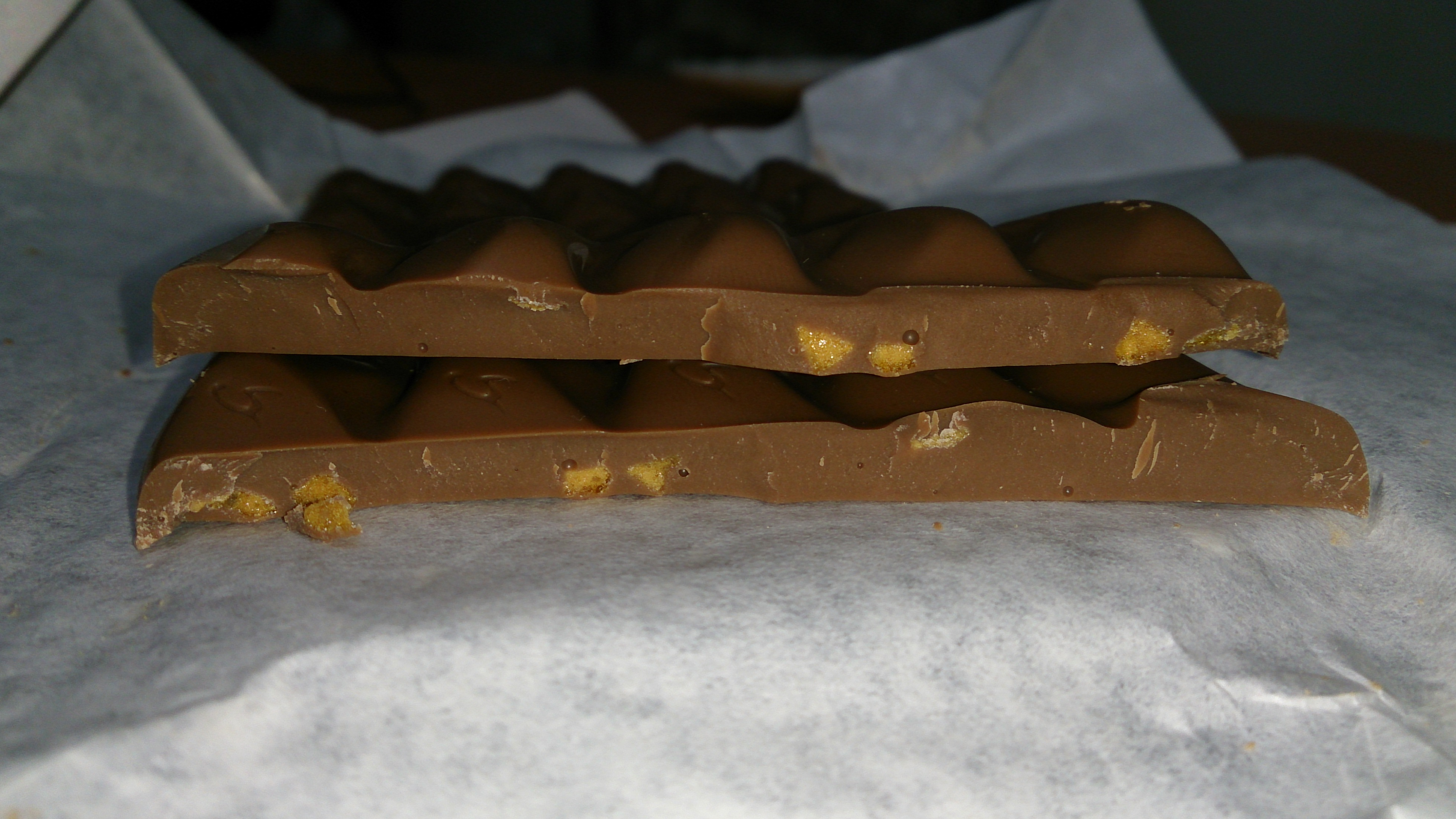
Large Galaxy Honeycomb Crisp bar, split in two

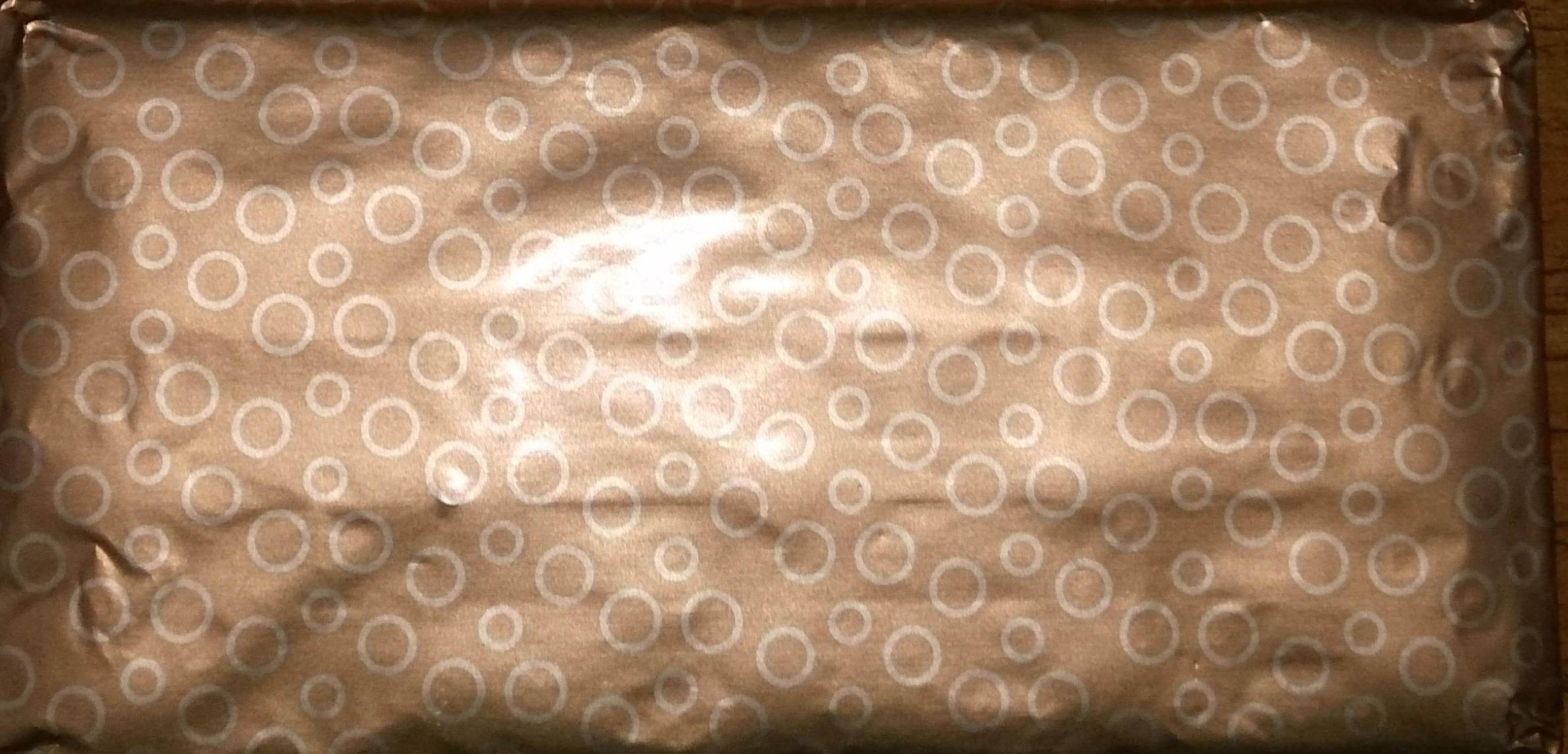
Golden inner wrapper of a large Galaxy Bubbles bar

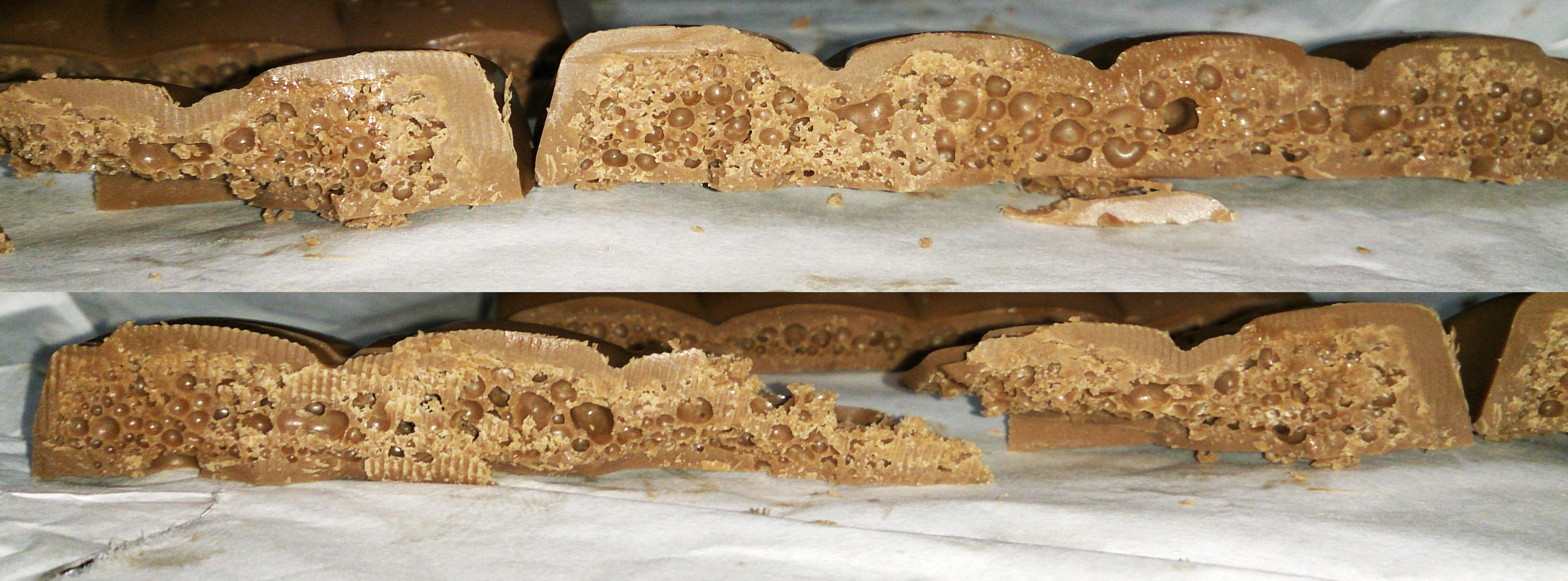
Galaxy Bubbles bar, split length wise, to give a view of what's inside

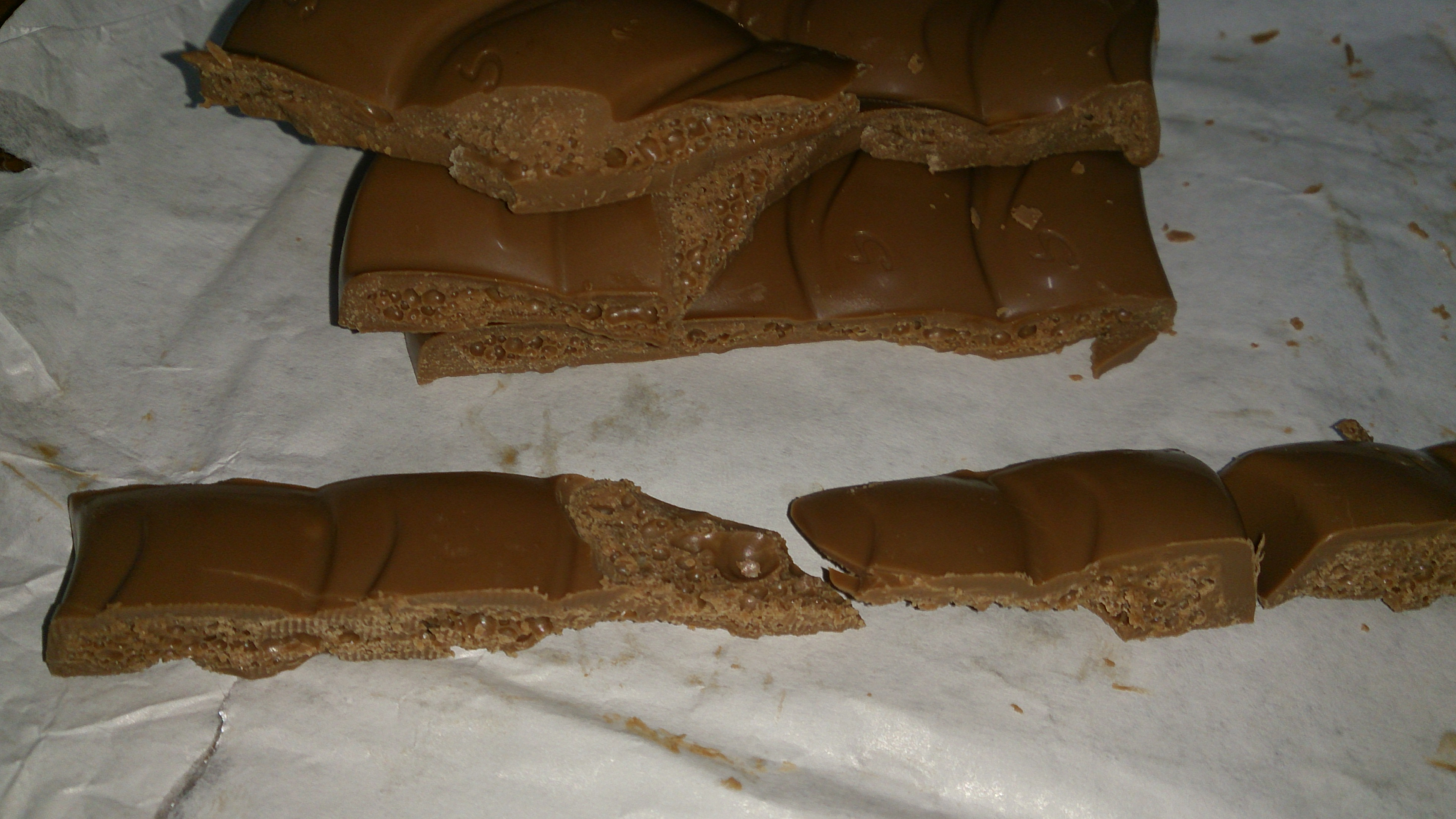
Collection of broken pieces of a Galaxy Bubbles, giving a good view into what it looks like inside

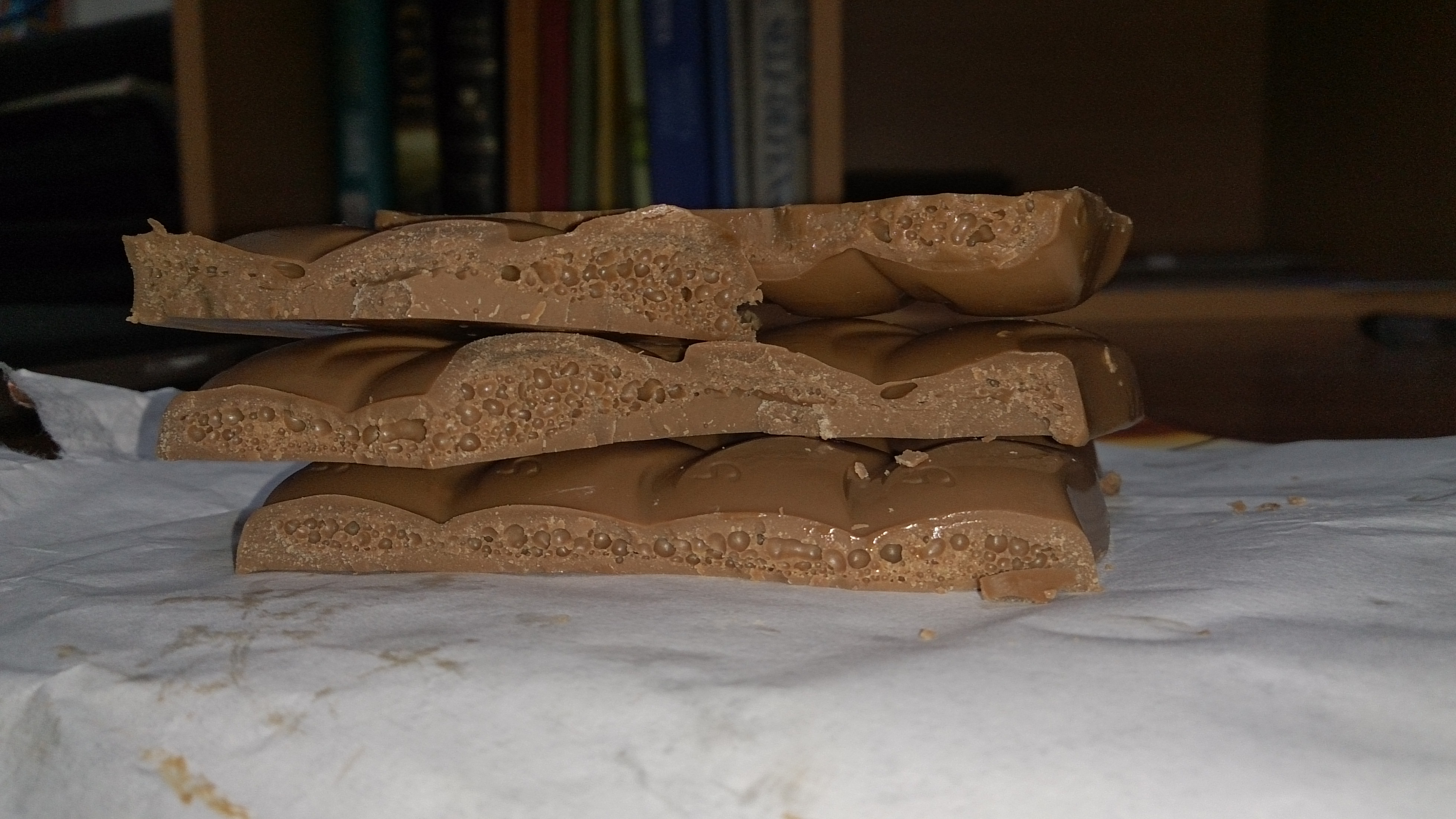
Galaxy Bubbles bar broken into chunks, and stacked. The aerated bubbles are clearly visible

== See also ==
- Mars Inc.
- List of chocolate bar brands
- Dove
