= Dove (chocolate brand) =

American brand of chocolate

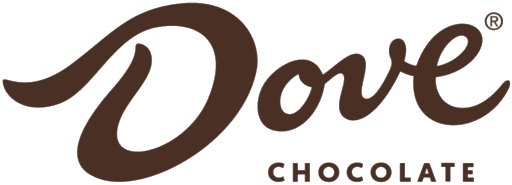

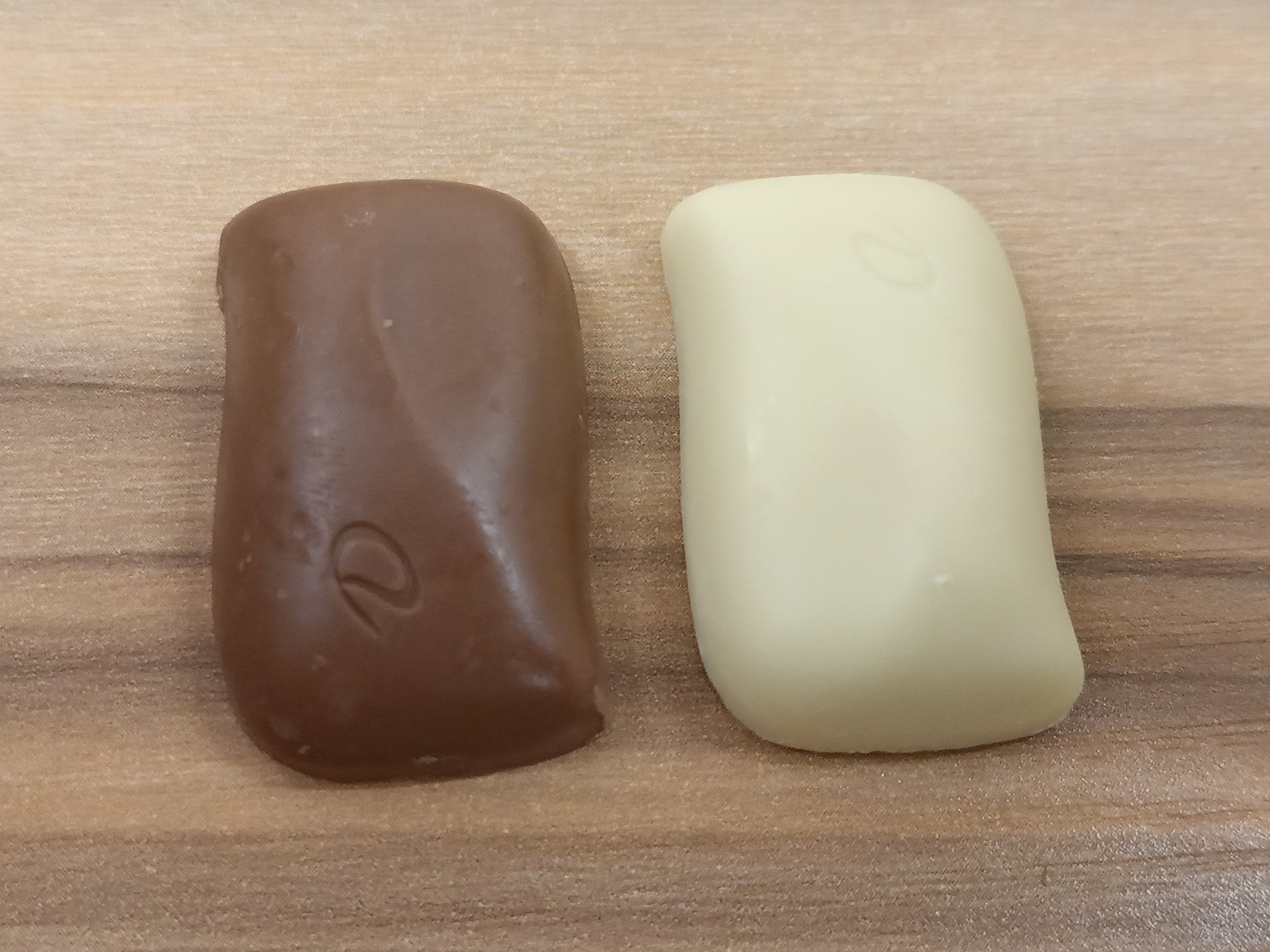
- Dove milk chocolate flavors
- Product type: Chocolate
- Current owner: Mars, Incorporated
- Produced by: Mars, Incorporated
- Country: United States
- Introduced: 1939; 87 years ago
- Related brands: Galaxy
- Markets: Worldwide
- Previous owners: Dove Candies & Ice Cream
- Tagline: Silky Smooth
- Website: dovechocolate.com

Dove is an American brand of chocolate owned and manufactured by Mars. Dove produces a wide range of chocolate candies, as well as other chocolate products such as milks, cakes and ice creams. In some markets around the world, Mars sells the products under the Galaxy name.

== History ==
The name comes from Dove Candies & Ice Cream, which were Chicago-based candy and ice cream shops owned by Leo Stefanos, a Greek-American in 1939. In 1956, Stefanos created the Dove brand of ice cream bars, which were only sold locally throughout Chicago until 1984 when Mike, Leo's son, took the DOVEBAR to the Fancy Foods Show in Washington, D.C., and orders started flooding in from across the country. In 1986, the company was acquired by Mars, Incorporated.

Dove chocolate bars were launched in test markets in the US in 1991.

In 1960, Dove chocolate was launched in the United Kingdom under the Galaxy brand name.

Dove-branded products have not been officially sold since the mid-2010s in Australia.

=== Chinese ad controversy ===
In August 2026, Zongzheng Food, the operator of Dove's Kuaishou account, published an advertisement in which a woman complained about her boyfriend not buying her a specific item from Dove but a man with whom she'd been flirting purchased it for her while her boyfriend was away. Dove apologized for the advertisement on its Weibo account following increased backlash at the brand due to the ad airing during the Qixi Festival and Zongzheng's initial response. On November 12, 2026, the Shanghai Municipal Market Supervision Administration announced that a fine of CN¥ 800,000 (US$119,933, S$154,000) had been assessed to Zongzheng Food in October for "promoting wrong views on marriage and relationships and violating good social customs".

== Products ==
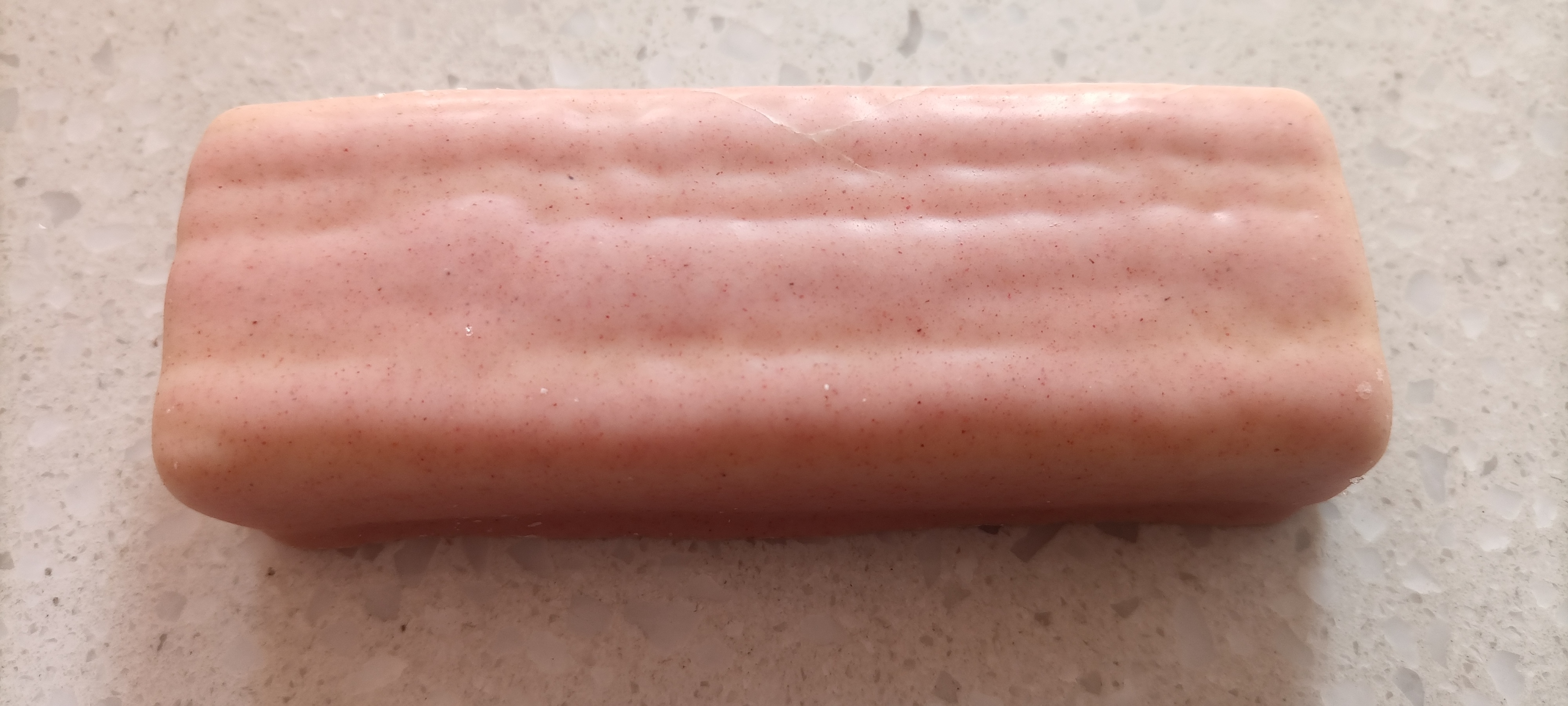
Dove strawberry chocolate ice cream

Dove's range of chocolates includes milk chocolate, dark chocolate, caramel, fruits, nuts, Minstrels, Ripple (milk chocolate with a folded or "rippled" milk chocolate center), Amicelli, Duetto, Promises, Bubbles, and Truffle. Related brands in other parts of the world include "Jewels", and "Senzi" in the Middle East. Dove also produces other chocolate products including ready-to-drink chocolate milk, hot chocolate powder, chocolate cakes, ice cream and more. Dove includes messages written on the inside of the foil wrapper of each individual chocolate piece.

== See also ==
- List of chocolate bar brands
