= Leo Stefanos =

Leo Stefanos was the owner of Dove Candies & Ice Cream in Chicago and the inventor of the Dove chocolate bar.

Born in Greece, Stefanos settled on Chicago's South Side to raise a family. According to Dove Chocolate company lore, he was frightened when his young son, Michael, raced recklessly down the street in pursuit of the neighborhood ice cream truck and decided to make his own ice cream bar in hope of keeping Michael and his brother and sister, Chris and Amy, closer to home. Michael took over his father's business in 1977. The blocky chocolate-covered bars were sold only in the Chicago area until after Stefano's death, when his son expanded the business and then sold it to Mars, Incorporated in 1986.
