= Jamie Laing =

English presenter, investor and television personality

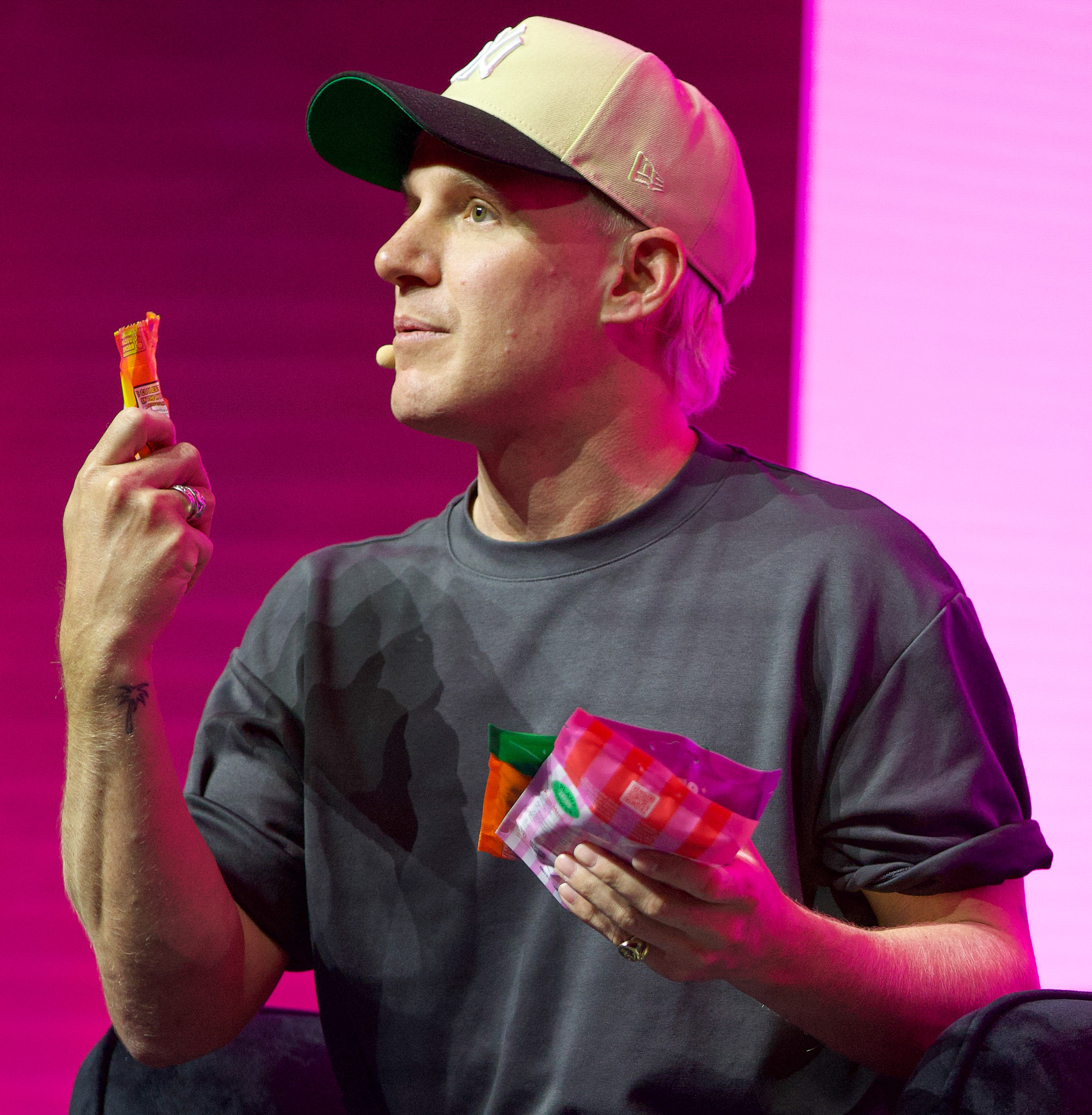
- Born: 1988 (age 37–38); Oxford, England
- Education: University of Leeds
- Occupations: Television presenter; television personality; investor
- Years active: 2011–present
- Television: Made in Chelsea
- Spouse: Sophie Habboo (m. 2023)
- Children: 1

James Laing (/ˈleɪŋ/ LAYNG) is an English presenter, television personality and investor. He is the co-founder of the confectionery company Candy Kittens and is best known for appearing on the reality television series Made in Chelsea since the second series in 2011. He runs and hosts three podcasts - "Newly Weds" with his wife, Private Parts, and a BBC Radio 1 podcast, 6 Degrees from Jamie and Spencer. As an actor, he has appeared in shows such as Hollyoaks, Murder In Successville and Drunk History. He is now a regular radio presenter on BBC Radio 1.

== Early life ==
Laing was born in 1988 to parents Penny and Nicholas. He has an older brother, Alexander, a younger brother, George, and a younger sister, Emily.

He was privately educated at both Summer Fields School (1997–2002) and Radley College, before attending the University of Leeds, where he studied Theatre and Performance.

Laing is the great-great-grandson of Sir Alexander Grant, 1st Baronet, who created the McVitie's digestive biscuit in 1892, and a great-nephew of the Lord Laing of Dunphail.

== Career ==
In 2011, Laing rose to fame through the E4 reality show Made in Chelsea, joining the show in the second series.

In 2012, Laing and friend Ed Williams launched confectionery company, Candy Kittens, which produces vegan and vegetarian sweets.

Laing's acting credits include playing a fashion show attendee in 2016's Absolutely Fabulous: The Movie and a doctor in a 2017 episode of Channel 4 soap opera Hollyoaks.

He also beat the previous world record in 'amount of jelly beans thrown in mouth per 30 seconds' on Series 12 Episode 3 of 8 Out of 10 Cats Does Countdown with 18 jellybeans; beating the previous record by 3.

In 2017, he appeared on the first series of Celebrity Hunted alongside his Made in Chelsea co-star Spencer Matthews. In 2018, he appeared in the third episode of the first season of The Great Stand Up to Cancer Bake Off.

In August 2019, Laing was named as one of the celebrities to star in the seventeenth series of Strictly Come Dancing; however a foot injury led him to withdraw on 5 September, two days before the launch show was aired, where he was paired with professional dancer Oti Mabuse. He was replaced by Kelvin Fletcher, who went on to win the series. The following year, he was announced as a contestant on the eighteenth series, where he was re-partnered with Karen Hauer, making the final and finishing as one of the runners-up. Laing was the first person to appear on two different series of Strictly.

In 2018, he filmed a Channel 4 documentary called Famous and Fighting Crime, in which he became a volunteer police officer in Peterborough.

Since early 2017, he has hosted a podcast, Private Parts, with his friend Francis Boulle, as well as starting a podcast on BBC Sounds in May 2020, 6 Degrees from Jamie and Spencer, with Spencer Matthews.

In 2021, Laing appeared on Richard Osman's House of Games.

From 28 October 2022, Laing replaced Mollie King on BBC Radio 1 while she was on maternity leave.

In March 2024, he replaced Jordan North on Radio 1's Going Home show.

== Personal life ==
Laing lives with his wife, Sophie Habboo, in London and Gloucestershire. They have been together since April 2019, and announced their engagement on Instagram on 18 December 2021. They married on 14 April 2023 in London, before heading to Marbella a month later for a second wedding in front of friends and family. In June 2025, the couple announced that they are expecting their first child. On 4 December 2025, they had their first child, a son named Ziggy.

In 2025, he ran five ultramarathons (more than 150 miles (240 km)) in five days for charity.
