= Katjes International =

German confectionary manufacturer

Katjes International GmbH & Co. KG
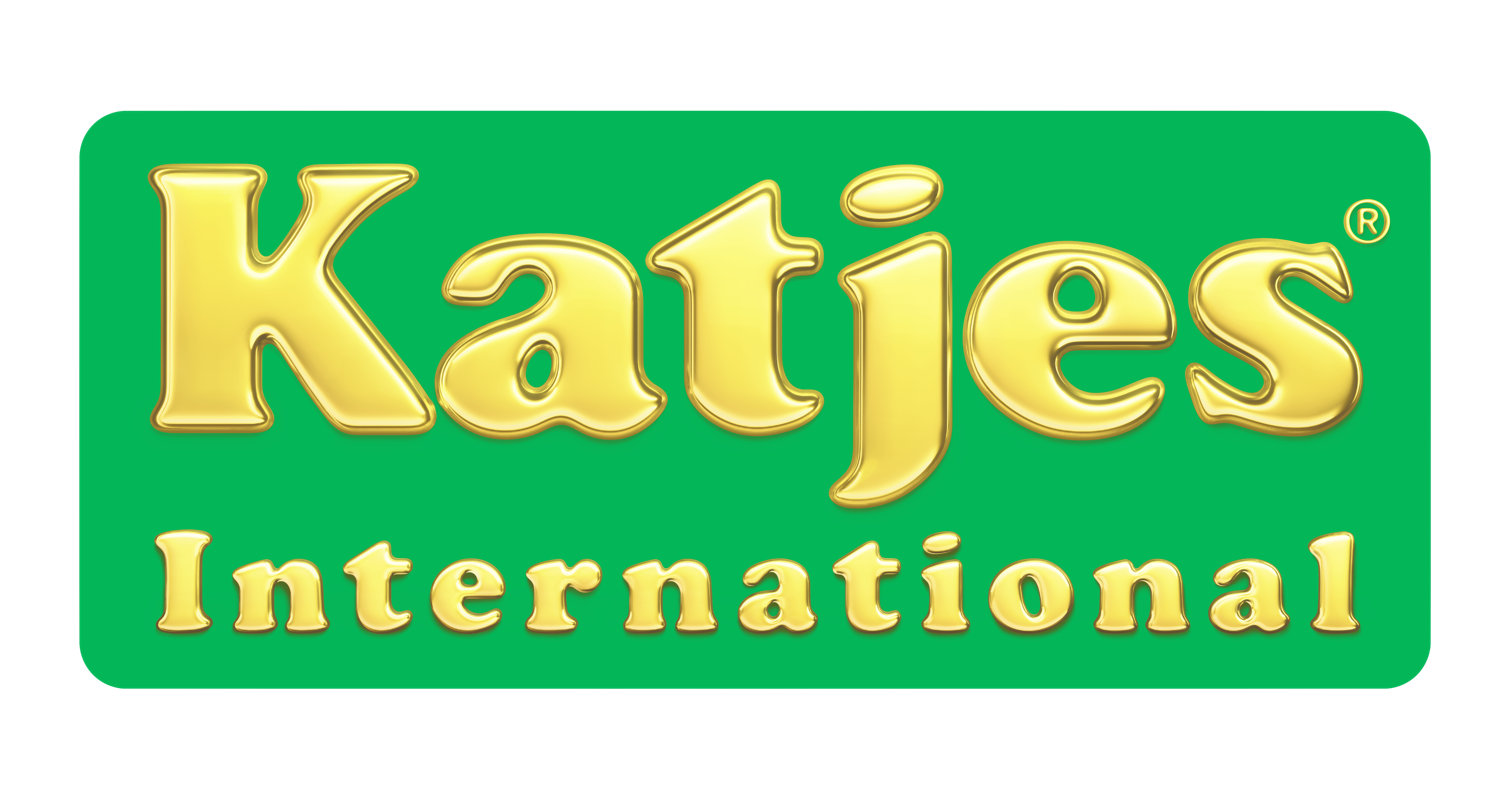
- Type: GmbH & Co. KG
- Industry: Confectionery manufacturer
- Founded: 1972
- Headquarters: Emmerich am Rhein, Kleve (district), North Rhine-Westphalia, Germany
- Key people: Tobias Bachmüller, Bastian Fassin (managing shareholders); Stephan Milde (managing director, CFO)
- Revenue: €308.4 million (2018)
- Website: katjes-international.de

Katjes International GmbH & Co. KG, headquartered in Emmerich am Rhein, is part of the Katjes Group, along with its sister company Katjes Fassin GmbH + Co. KG (Katjes Deutschland) and Katjesgreenfood GmbH & Co. KG. The company is focused on investments in the Western European sugar confectionery market.

Katjes International is a strategic investment holding in the Katjes Group. As a strategic investor, the company pursues a long-term "Buy and Hold" approach. As part of this, the subsidiaries remain legally and organisationally independent after the takeover and run by local management.

== History ==
Katjes International pools the investment activities of the Katjes Group in western Europe. In 2010, Katjes International purchased a 50% stake in the Dutch company Festivaldi, which produces the best-selling liquorice product by volume in the Netherlands ("Harlekijntjes"). In 2011, Katjes International took over the confectionery manufacturer Lutti. Lutti is the market leader in the Belgian confectionery market and occupies second place in France. In early 2012, Katjes International acquired the Belgian distributor Continental Sweets Belgium N.V. and, in the same year, also acquired Dallmann & Co., which has since been supplementing the product portfolio in the sage cough candy segment.

With its acquisition of Piasten in September 2014, Katjes International took over the largest producer of dragées and chocolate drops in Germany. Its product portfolio also includes the 'Big Ben' brand. In the previous financial year, Piasten generated net revenues of €91.6 million (as of 30 June 2014). In January 2016, Katjes increased its stake in the Dutch company Festivaldi to 100%. On 9 June 2017, Katjes International announced that it had acquired a stake in Josef Manner & Comp. AG. This was followed on 5 September 2017 by a takeover of the entire brand name business of Cloetta Italia S.r.l. (today called Sperlari S.r.l. again). Founded in 1836 by Enea Sperlari, the company is now the second-largest player in the Italian confectionery market and the market leader in the segment comprising sweets, liquorice, sweeteners and seasonal products.

At the end of August 2018, Katjes International's negotiations with the CPK Group (Carambar & Co. SAS), based in Issy-les-Moulineaux, which was founded by the investment company Eurazeo, began through a merger of the French confectionery activities. The merger was completed on 31 December 2018.

In December 2018 it was announced that the stake of just under 11% in the Halloren chocolate factory was sold to Charlie Investors.

After the acquisition of 25% in the British Candy Kittens Limited by Katjes International in August 2019, the stake was increased to more than 50% in November 2019. The company was founded by Jamie Laing, known from the British TV series "Made in Chelsea", and offers vegetarian and gluten-free sweets without artificial flavours or colours.

== Company ==
Bastian Fassin owns 90 percent of the company, and Tobias Bachmüller owns the remaining 10 percent. Both are managing shareholders. The general partner of Katjes International GmbH & Co. KG is Xaver Fassin International GmbH.`

From 2014 to the end of 2016, the company was the sponsor of Formula 1 racing driver Nico Hülkenberg. Hülkenberg was already an advertising medium for the Katjes Group in 2010.

Katjes International is an independent sister to the german confectionery producer Katjes Fassin GmbH & Co.

== Financing ==
In order to finance further acquisitions and continue its growth strategy, Katjes International issued a corporate bond with a volume of €30 million in July 2011. The bond had a term of five years and a fixed coupon of 7.125% per annum. In March 2012, the corporate bond was increased by a further 50% to a total of €45 million. In May 2015, Katjes International issued a new corporate bond (2015/2020) with a volume of €60 million and an annual interest rate of 5.5 percent and placed it in full. The 2011/2016 bond was called ahead of term and paid back on 20 July 2015. On 16 May 2017, the 2015/2020 bond was increased by €35 million.

In April 2019, Katjes International issued a third bond and placed it fully. It has an issue volume of €110 million with an annual interest rate of 4.25 percent and has a term of five years.

== Brands ==
Katjes International and its affiliated companies own brands in various Western European countries.

- Piasten (Germany): "Treets", "Schokolinsen", sugar coated products as Schokolinsen and Big Ben
- Dallmann's (Germany): Dallmanns "Sage cough drops" (the established brand in German pharmacies)
- Harlekijntjes (Netherlands): liquorice products of the Harlekijntjes brand
- Sperlari (Italy): the best-known brands include Sperlari (fruit gums, sweets, Italian nougat known as 'torrone'), Saila (liquorice), Dietorelle (sugar-free products) and Dietor (sweetener), Paluani.
- Candy Kittens (UK): A high-end gourmet sweet brand based in the United Kingdom.
- Percy Pig (UK): Pig shaped gummy sweets, produced for Marks & Spencer

== Awards ==
Katjes International has won several awards for its strategy and its achievements in the investment market.
