= Galaxy Minstrels =

Brand of chocolate confectionery

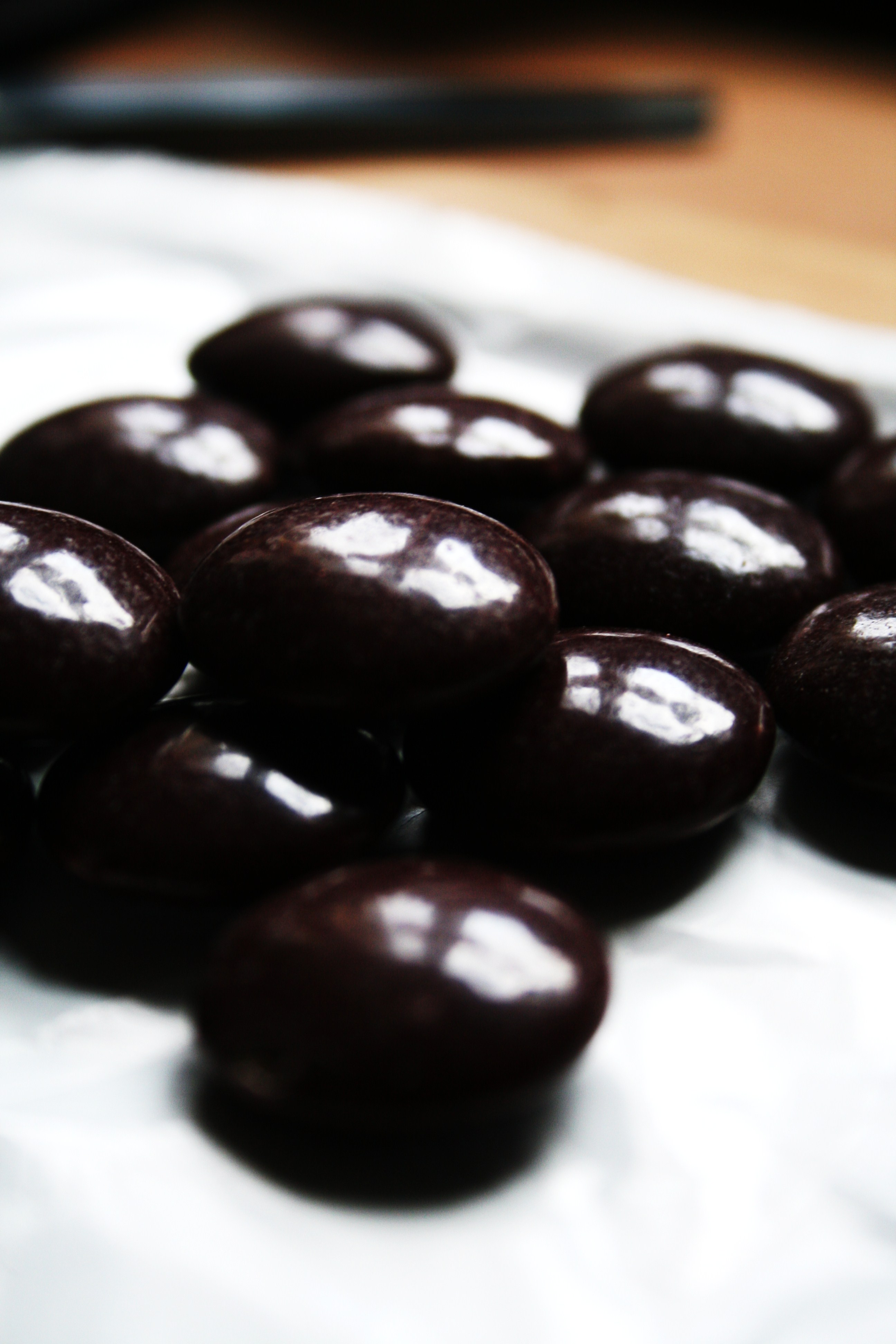
Minstrels

Galaxy Minstrels are milk chocolate buttons with a hard glazed shell sold in several countries including the United Kingdom, Republic of Ireland, South Africa, Kenya, Cyprus, Malta, Canada and Spain. In line with Mars' re-branding, Minstrels were brought under the Galaxy brand and are now sold as "Galaxy Minstrels", referring to the use of Galaxy chocolate in them.

== Advertising ==
They originally had the slogan "The chocolates that melt in your mouth, not in your hand", featuring in 1980s British advertisements, the same slogan used in the UK for Treets in the 1960s, and for M&M's in the UK and US up to the 1990s.

A British advertising campaign in July 2008 was accompanied by a new slogan: "Sophisticated sharing". One of their advertisements featured two women, consuming Minstrels, ostensibly in an upmarket theatre, commenting knowledgeably on their seats and the theatre acoustics, only to be revealed as delighted viewers of a male strip act.

== See also ==
- Treets another Mars-owned brand of sugar-shelled confectionery that pre-dated Minstrels
- Smarties, a similar brand of chocolate sweets in sugar shells with different colours
- M&M's, a Mars owned brand of sugar-shelled chocolates
- Revels, a Mars-owned brand of chocolate that includes Minstrels
