= List of Mars Inc. brands =

This is a list of brands owned by Mars Inc.

== Mars Edge ==
Mars Edge is primarily food nutrition research and development.

- CocoaVia
- Foodspring

== Mars Food ==
Mars Food is primarily food manufacturing and brands.

- Abu Siouf
- Ben's Original
- Dolmio
- Ebly
- Kan Tong
- MasterFoods
- Mirácoli
- OXO (only in South Africa)
- Pamesello
- Ráris
- Royco
- Seeds of Change
- Suzi Wan
- Tasty Bite

== Mars Petcare ==
Mars Petcare is primarily pet food manufacturing and brands as well as pet healthcare services, technologies, and brands.

=== Mars Veterinary Health ===
Mars Veterinary Health is composed of pet healthcare services and provider networks.

==== Mars Veterinary Health North America ====
- Banfield Pet Hospital
- BluePearl Specialty and Emergency Pet Hospital
- VCA Animal Hospitals

==== Mars Veterinary Health International and Diagnostics ====
- AniCura
- Antech Diagnostic / Sound
- Asia Veterinary Diagnostics
- Linnaeus Veterinary Group
- Mount Pleasant Veterinary Group
- Veterinary Emergency & Specialty (VES) Hospital Singapore
- Veterinary Specialty Hospital of Hong Kong (VSH Hong Kong)
- Creature Comforts Group
- Tai Wai Small Animal and Exotic 24 Hour Hospital

=== Pet food and supplies ===
- Acana
- ADVANCE (Australia and New Zealand only)
- API
- Aquarian
- Aquariam Pharmaceuticals
- Buckeye Nutrition
- Catisfactions
- Cesar Canine Cuisine
- Chappi
- Crave
- Dreamies
- Dine
- Exelcat
- Eukanuba (except in Europe)
- Exelpet
- Frolic
- The Goodlife Recipe
- Good-o
- Greenies
- Iams (except in Europe)
- James Wellbeloved
- Kit-e-Kat
- Max
- My Dog
- Natura
- Nutro Products
- Pedigree
- Orijen
- Optimum
- Perfect Fit
- Pill Pockets
- PrettyLitter
- Royal Canin
- Schmackos
- Sheba
- Spillers
- Teasers
- Techni-Cal
- Temptations
- Trill
- Ultra
- Whiskas
- Winergy

=== Pet technology and investments ===
- Waltham Petcare Science Institute

==== Companion Fund ====
The Companion Fund is an over $100 million investment fund that focuses on pet technology and pet care.

Through this fund, Mars has invested in:

- Companion
- Made by Nacho
- Mollybox
- Native Pet
- Pawp
- PetMedix
- Rejuvenate Bio
- RiverDog
- ScoutBio
- Scratchpay
- Smalls
- Tailwise

==== Kinship ====
Kinship is an investment entity that focuses on pet technology and pet care.

Through this fund, Mars has invested in:

- FluffyGo
- Leap Venture Studio & academy
- Pet Insight Project
- Pet Story
- VetInSight
- Whistle
- Wisdom Panel

== Mars Snacking ==
Mars Snacking is primarily chocolate, chewing gum, snacks, and confections manufacturing and brands.

=== Mars ===
- 3 Musketeers
- Amicelli
- American Heritage Chocolate
- Balisto
- Bounty
- Celebrations
- Cirku
- CocoaVia
- Combos
- Dove
- Dove Bar
- Ethel M Chocolates
- FLAVIA
- Fling
- Forever Yours
- Galaxy
- Galaxy Bubbles
- Galaxy Honeycomb Crisp
- Galaxy Minstrels
- goodnessKNOWS
- M&M's
- M&M's World
- Maltesers
- Marathon
- Mars
- Milky Way
- Munch
- My M&M's
- Promite
- Revels
- Seeds of Change
- Snickers
- Tracker
- Chocolates Turín (Mexico)
- Twix

=== The Wrigley Company ===
- 5 (gum)
- A. Korkunov
- Airwaves
- Alert
- Alpine
- Altoids
- Big Red
- Bubble Tape
- Callard & Bowser-Suchard
- Doublemint
- Eclipse
- Eclipse Ice
- Excel
- Extra
- Freedent
- Hubba Bubba
- Juicy Fruit
- Life Savers
- Lockets
- Orbit
- Ouch!
- Skittles
- Starburst
- Sugus
- Surpass
- Rondo
- Tunes
- Wrigley's
- Wrigley's Spearmint
- Winterfresh

=== Kellanova ===
- All-Bran
- Barras
- Biscoito Integral
- Bran Flakes
- Austin
- Carr's
- Cheez-It
- Club Crackers
- Coco Pops
- Cocoa Krispies
- Corn Flakes
  - Bright Start
- Crunchy Nut
- Eggo
- Froot Loops
- Frosted Flakes
  - Frosties
  - Zucaritas
- Fruit 'n Fibre
- Grahams Crackers
- Granola Integral
- Honey Pops
- Honey Smacks
- Kellogg's
  - Kellogg's Chocos
  - Kellogg's Extra
  - Kellogg's Granola
  - Kellogg's Muesli
- Komplete
- Krave
- LCMs
- Kellogg's and Smucker's Velveeta Shells & Cheese
- Morningstar Farms
- Müsli
- Nutri-Grain
- Parati
- Pop-Tarts
- Pringles
- Pure Organic
- Rice Krispies
  - Rice Bubbles
  - Rice Krispies Treats
  - Rice Krispies Squares
- Rxbar
- Special K
- Sucrilhos
- Sultana Bran
- Toasteds
- Town House
- Trésor
- Wheats
- Zesta
- Zimmy's Cinnamon Stars

=== Other brands ===
- Hotel Chocolat
- KIND
- Tru Fru

=== Discontinued product lines ===
- AquaDrops
- Banjo Candy Bar
- Bliss Candy Bar
- Bisc &
- Cookies &
- Corn Quistos
- Flyte
- Kudos
- M-Azing
- Pacers
- PB Max
- Royals
- Spangles
- Summit Cookie Bars
- Topic
- Treets

== Former brands ==
- Pet Partners (Now a part of VCA Animal Hospitals)
- Big League Chew (Acquired by Ford Gum)
- Flavia Beverage Systems (Acquired by Lavazza)
- KLIX
