= Mars Inc. =

American multinational food and animal care corporation

Mars, Incorporated
- Logo used since March 2019

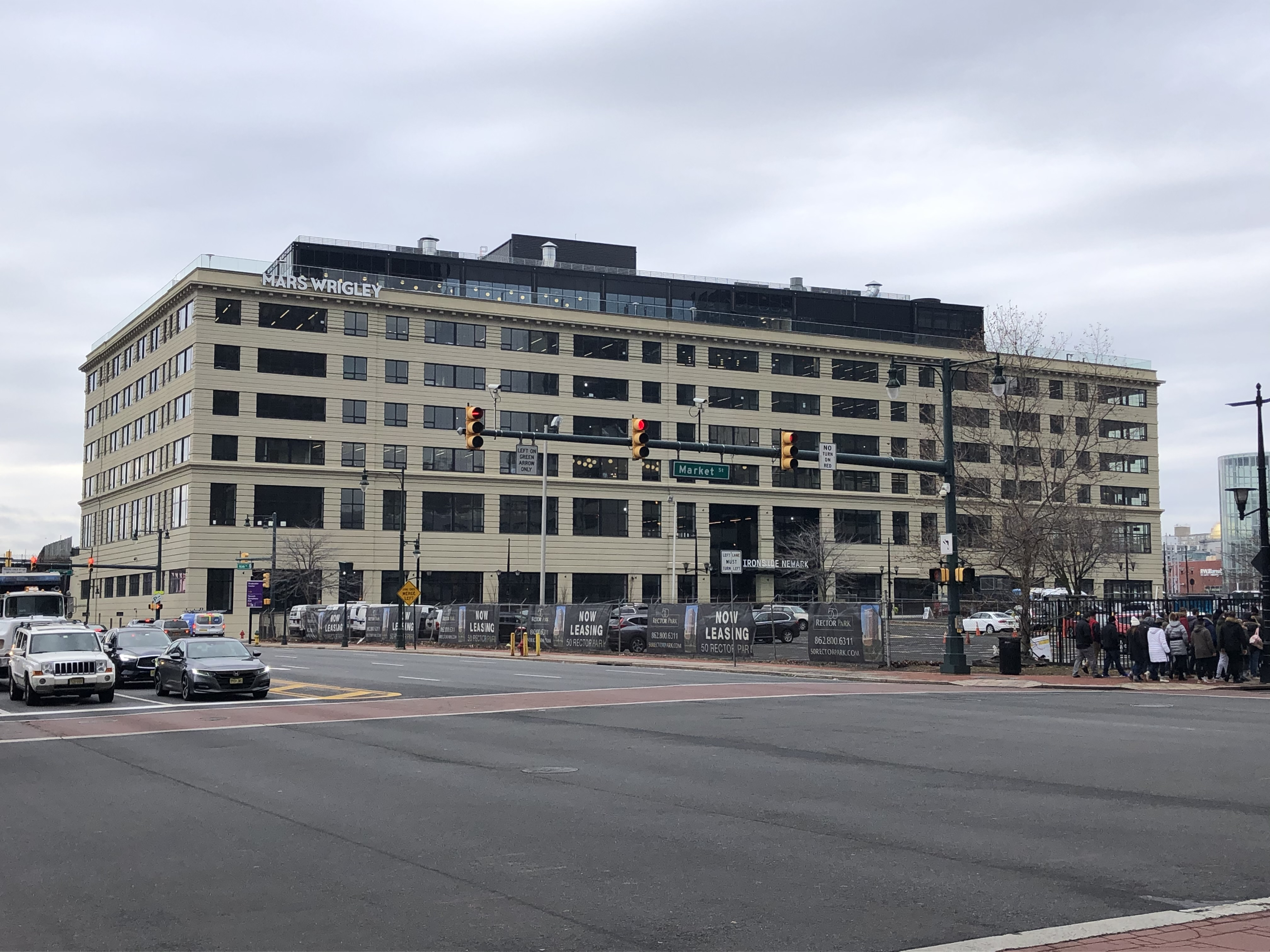
- Mars Wrigley US headquarters in Newark, New Jersey
- Type: Private
- Industry: Food; Veterinary services
- Founded: June 23, 1911; 115 years ago in Tacoma, Washington, U.S.
- Founder: Franklin Clarence Mars
- Headquarters: McLean, Virginia, U.S.
- Area served: Worldwide
- Key people: John Franklyn Mars (chairman); Poul Weihrauch (president and CEO)
- Products: Confectionery; Gum; Candy; Mints; Beverages; Foodstuffs; Cereals (outside North America); Crackers; Toaster pastries; Pet food and supplies
- Brands: List of Mars Inc. brands
- Services: Manufacturing; Veterinary
- Revenue: ▲US$65 billion (2026)
- Owner: Mars family
- Number of employees: 150,000 (2026)
- Divisions: Mars Snacking; Mars Petcare; Mars Food; Mars Edge
- Subsidiaries: VCA Animal Hospitals
- Website: mars.com

Mars, Incorporated (doing business as Mars Inc.) is an American multinational manufacturer of confectionery, pet food, and other food products and a provider of animal care services founded on June 23, 1911. Mars is headquartered in McLean, Virginia, in the Washington metropolitan area, and is entirely owned by the Mars family. The company had US$45 billion in annual sales in 2022; that year Forbes ranked the company as the fourth-largest privately held company in the United States.

Mars operates in four subsidiaries around the world: Snacking (headquartered in Chicago, Illinois, with U.S. headquarters in Hackettstown and Newark, New Jersey), Petcare (Zaventem, Belgium; Poncitlán, Jalisco, Mexico; Querétaro, Mexico), Food (Rancho Dominguez, California) and Mars Edge (Germantown, Maryland), the company's life sciences division.

Mars is a company known for the confectionery items that it manufactures, such as Mars bars, 3 Musketeers, Milky Way bars, M&M's, Skittles, Snickers, Twix, and Bounty. It also produces non-confectionery snacks, such as Combos, and other foods, including Ben's Original, and pasta sauce brand Dolmio, as well as pet foods, such as Pedigree, Whiskas, Nutro and Royal Canin brands.

== History ==
Former Mars logo, used from 1911 until 2019

Orbit gum is among the most popular brands, managed by the Mars subsidiary brand Wrigley. During World War II, Wrigley was selling their eponymous gum only to soldiers, while Orbit was sold to the public. Though abandoned shortly after the war, about 30 years later, Orbit came back to America.

Franklin Clarence Mars, whose mother taught him to hand dip candy, sold candy by age 19. He started the Mars Candy Factory on June 23, 1911, with Ethel V. Mars, his second wife, in Tacoma, Washington. This factory produced and sold fresh candy wholesale, but ultimately the venture failed because there was a better established business, Brown & Haley, also operating in Tacoma. By 1920, Mars had returned to his home state, Minnesota, where the earliest incarnation of the present day Mars company was founded that year as Mar-O-Bar Co., in Minneapolis and later incorporated there as Mars, Incorporated.

In 1923, Forrest Mars Sr., son of Frank and his first wife, Ethel G. Mars, was discussing his father's business struggles with him at a soda fountain. Inspired by his beverage, Forrest suggested that his father base a candy bar on a chocolate malted milk milkshake. Frank took the suggestion and, making use of the neglected ingredient Minneapolis nougat, introduced the Milky Way bar, advertised as a "chocolate malted milk in a candy bar", which became the best-selling candy bar. In 1929, Frank moved the company to Chicago and started full production in a plant which still exists today. In 1930, Frank Mars created the Snickers bar and first sold it in US markets. In 1932, Mars introduced the 3 Musketeers bar.

In 1932, Forrest Mars was given a check by his father as well as the foreign rights to market the Milky Way. The younger Mars moved to Great Britain and started his own company, Mars Limited, in the town of Slough. The Mars bar was launched there to great success. He continued to expand his company over the next decades.

Following the death of Frank Mars in 1934, the Mars company ownership was placed into the hands of his widow's family. Ethel V. Mars served as president, but company activities were otherwise run by her half-brother, William Kruppenbacher. In gradual phases, Forrest Mars, who ran his own Mars company in Britain, finally took control of his father's company in Chicago by 1964 and merged the two entities together into one Mars.

Mars moved its headquarters to McLean, Virginia, in 1984. In 2001, Mars purchased the Lucas candy company. In 2004, Lucas was discontinued when high amounts of lead were found inside their candies.

Mars's purchase of Doane Petcare Company in June 2007 significantly increased Mars's position in the U.S. dry pet food category. In addition to these businesses, Mars also operates a chain of premium chocolate shops called Ethel M Chocolates. These shops are an outgrowth of the Ethel M premium chocolate business that Forrest Mars started in Las Vegas in 1980 when he became bored with retirement.

From May 1, 2007, many Mars products made in the UK became unsuitable for vegetarians. The company announced that it would be using whey made with animal rennet (material from a calf's stomach lining, and a byproduct of veal), instead of using rennet made by microorganisms, in products including Mars, Twix, Snickers, Maltesers, Bounty, Minstrels and Milky Way. The response from many consumers, particularly the Vegetarian Society's request for UK vegetarians to register their protests with Mars, generated extensive press and caused the company to abandon the plans shortly after. Mars switched to all-vegetarian sources in the UK.

In 2008, Mars and theBelGroup conducted a research study that resurrected the famous Mars slogan "Work, Rest & Play." Packaged and led the global launch of the Mars Refuel Sports drink. Initiated and implemented sponsorship program "The Mars Refuel Drink Fund."

On April 28, 2008, Mars, Incorporated, together with Berkshire Hathaway Incorporated, announced the buyout of Wm. Wrigley Jr. Company, the world's largest chewing gum producer, for $23 billion in an all-cash deal. The two companies together generated sales of over $30 billion in 2008. Mars's US confectionery division, Masterfoods USA (formerly M&M Mars), was merged into Wrigley, and its chocolate products were reorganized into the newly formed subsidiary Mars Chocolate North America, LLC.

The company published its Principles in Action communication in September 2011. This communication outlines the history of Mars, its legacy as a business committed to its Five Principles, and the company's goal of putting its Principles into action to make a difference to people and the planet through performance. Encompassing themes of Health and Nutrition, Supply Chain, Operations, Products, and Working at Mars, the Principles in Action communication outlines Mars, Incorporated's targets, progress, and ongoing challenges. It also describes its businesses, including Petcare, Chocolate, Wrigley, Food, Drinks, Symbioscience.

The company spent more than $1.8 million on lobbying during 2008, almost all of it at Patton Boggs, where it has long been one of the largest lobbying clients. Mars also spent $10,000 at Skadden, Arps, Slate, Meagher & Flom. In 2009, Mars also hired Ernst & Young to lobby on corporate and international tax issues, including issues related to tax changes proposed by the Obama administration. The company spent another $1,655,000 that year.

In February 2016, Mars stated that it would no longer be using artificial colors in any of its candy products. In 2016, Mars Inc. announced the merger of its chocolate and Wrigley segments to form a new subsidiary, called "Mars Wrigley Confectionery". In 2017, the company's confectionery segment announced a return to its roots, and opened a new office in Newark, New Jersey.

In May 2020, Mars filed a lawsuit against JAB Holding over claims that Jacek Szarzynski, a former JAB Holding executive stole various confidential documents and passed them to the owner of Pret a Manger and Panera Bread. According to the lawsuit, over 6,000 Mars internal documents, including detailed financial results, strategic planning documents, and potential acquisition targets, were illegally downloaded.

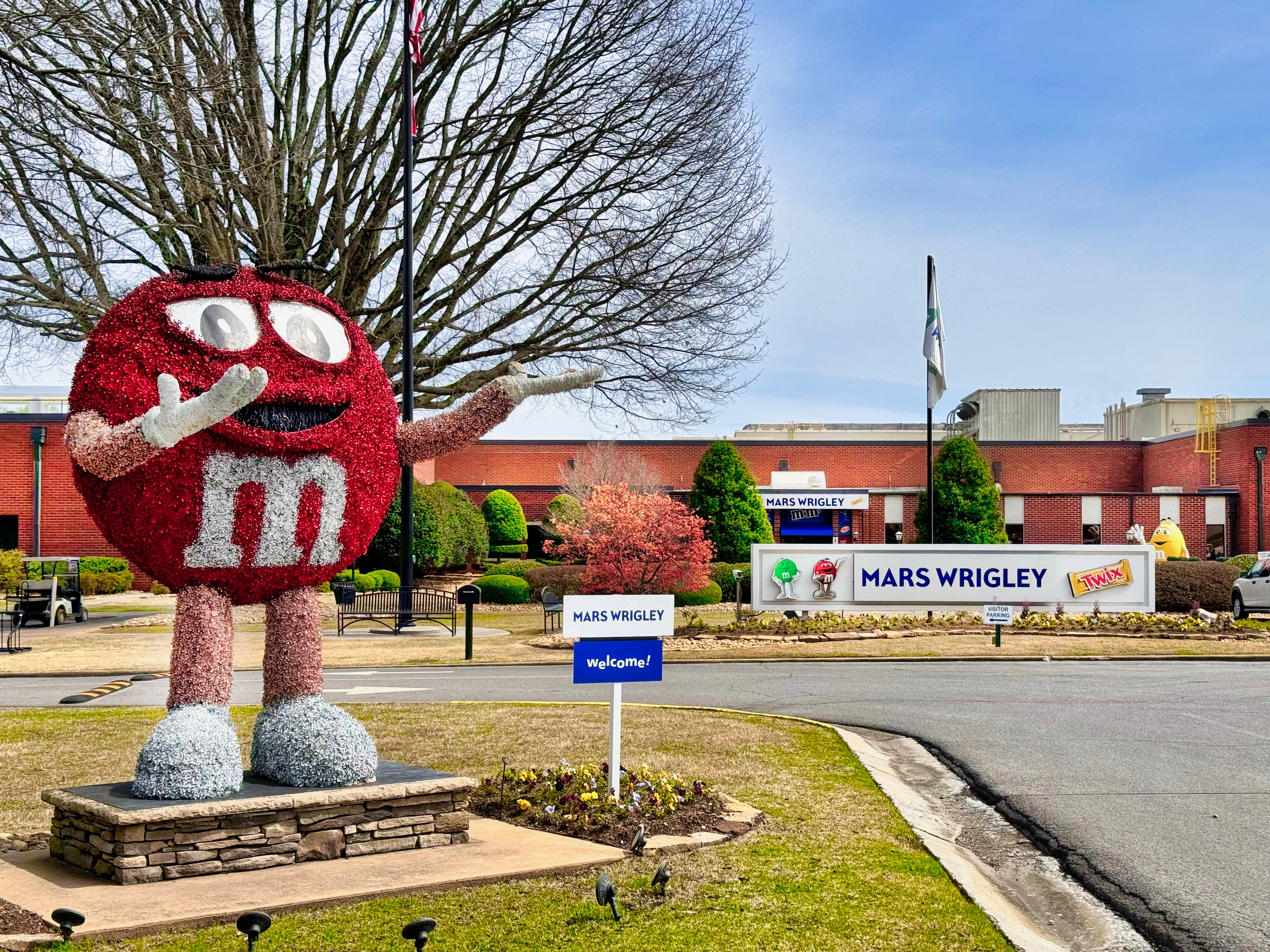
Mars Wrigley's chocolate manufacturing plant in Cleveland, Tennessee, produces M&M's and Twix

In the United States, the company has 22 manufacturing facilities in Hackettstown, New Jersey; Albany, Georgia; Burr Ridge, Illinois; Minneapolis, Minnesota; Chicago, Illinois; and Mattoon, Illinois; Cleveland, Tennessee; Chattanooga, Tennessee; Columbia, South Carolina; Columbus, Ohio; Elizabethtown, Pennsylvania; Greenville, Mississippi; Greenville and Waco, Texas; Henderson and Reno, Nevada; Fort Smith, Arkansas; Joplin, Missouri; Kansas City, Missouri; Miami, Oklahoma; and Galena, Kansas. Their newest chocolate producing facility, the first in 23 years, was established in 2014 at a cost of $270 million and is situated in Topeka, Kansas. Their Canadian facilities are located in Bolton and Newmarket, Ontario.

In November 2020, Mars acquired full ownership of snack food company Kind North America for $5 billion. Two years later in December 2022, it was announced Mars had acquired the Utah headquartered whole-fruit snacking brand, Trü Frü, the acquisition forming a new health and wellness sub-brand which will include the brand, Kind and Nature's Bakery. A further acquisition was made in November 2023 when Mars purchased the Hotel Chocolat for £534 million. The company would remain independent from Mars's brands and for such will have no recipe changes or no Mars products within its stores, the company hopes to bring it to more markets. It increases Mars's retail presence, a presence they already had with M&M's World. The acquisition was complete by January 25, 2024.

On September 1, 2023, Ukraine's National Agency on Corruption Prevention (NACP) has included two leading food corporations, PepsiCo and Mars, on the list of international sponsors of the war. Despite the declaration of reduction of their business, cessation of advertising activities, and production of their products, they continue to work in the Russian Federation.

On August 14, 2024, Mars Inc. announced its acquisition of Kellanova, which was known as Kellogg's until 2023 (its spun-off North American cereal business is WK Kellogg Co, now owned by Ferrero SpA), for $83.50 per share in cash, for a total consideration of $35.9 billion, including assumed net leverage. According to the companies, this is the largest acquisition of 2024 to date, while analysts described it as the largest CPG transaction since the merger between Kraft and Heinz in 2015.

The agreement has been unanimously approved by the Board of Directors of Kellanova. The transaction is subject to Kellanova shareholder approval and other customary closing conditions, including regulatory approvals, and is expected to close within the first half of 2025. The transaction agreement permits Kellanova to declare and pay quarterly dividends that are consistent with historical practice prior to the closing of the transaction. On December 11, 2025, Mars successfully acquired Kellanova after its $36 billion bid won European Union approval after regulators backtracked on earlier concerns.

== Subsidiaries ==
=== Mars Snacking ===
Mars Snacking
- Logo used since the acquisition of Kellanova in December 2025

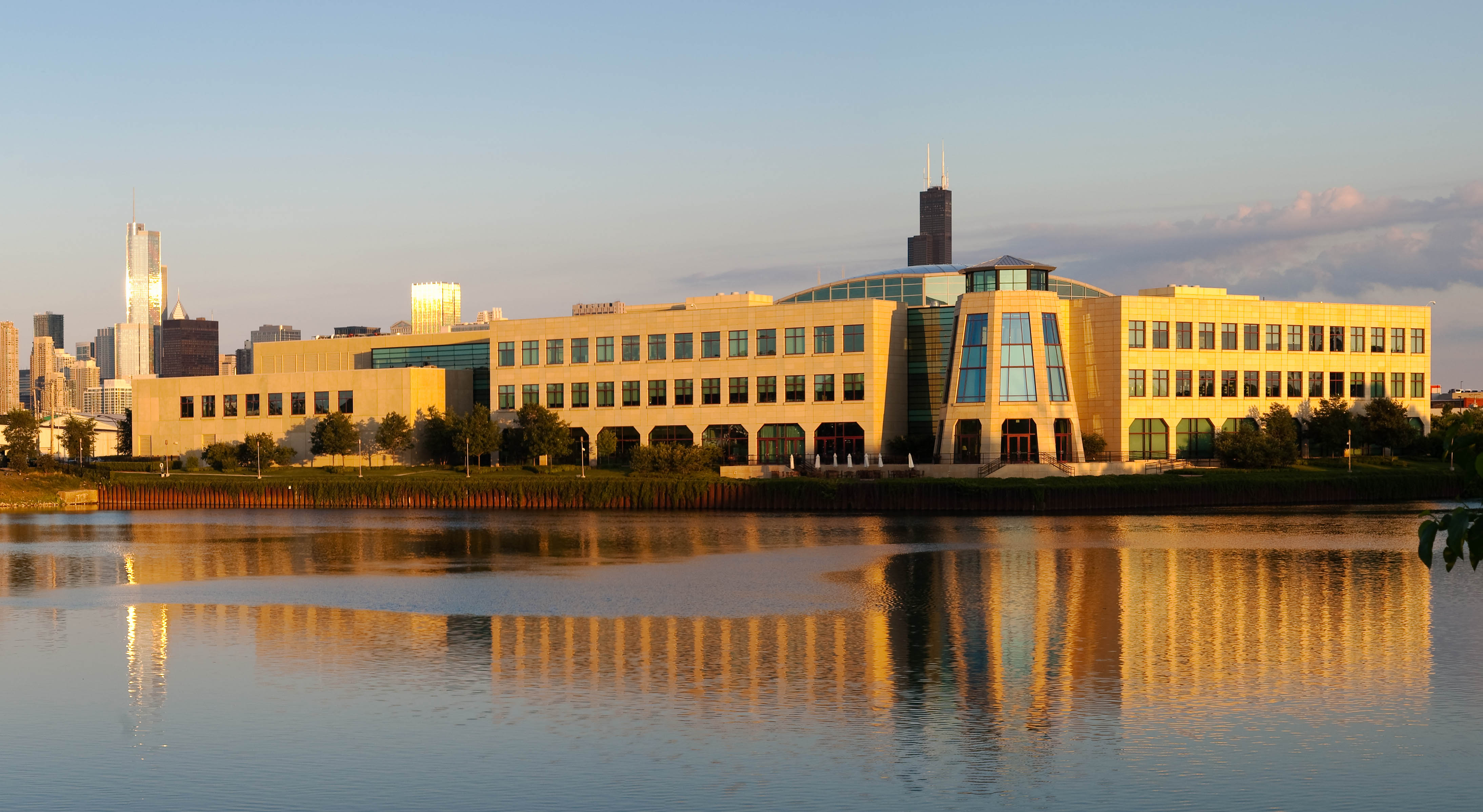
- Global Innovation Center in Chicago
- Formerly: Mars Wrigley Confectionery (2017–2023)
- Type: Division
- Industry: Food
- Founded: 2017; 9 years ago
- Headquarters: Global Innovation Center, Goose Island (Chicago), Illinois, U.S.
- Area served: Worldwide
- Key people: Andrew Clarke (global president)
- Products: Confectionery; Gum; Candy; Mints; Cereals (outside North America); Crackers; Toaster pastries
- Revenue: 35,000,000,000 United States dollar (2017)
- Number of employees: 80,000 (2017)
- Parent: Mars Inc.
- Subsidiaries: Wrigley Company; Accelerator; Hotel Chocolat; Kellanova
- Website: www.mars.com/our-brands/mars-snacking

Mars Snacking (formerly known as Mars Wrigley Confectionery) is the confectionery and snacking division of Mars. In 2016, Mars announced that the Wrigley Company would be merged with its chocolate segment, Mars Chocolate North America, LLC, to form a new subsidiary, Mars Wrigley Confectionery. The new company would maintain global offices in Chicago, while moving its U.S. offices to Hackettstown and Newark, New Jersey, Wrigley CEO Martin Ravdan would lead the combined business. In 2018, the company appointed Andrew Clarke as its CEO, replacing Martin Ravdan, he started his tenure as CEO in September of the same year.

Following the acquisition of Kellanova, it was integrated into a rebranded Mars Snacking (which now uses the Kellogg K and the Wrigley G as part of the logo). Kellanova was also delisted from the New York Stock Exchange and its CEO Steve Cahillane stepped down from the company. The acquisition expanded the division's reach, with more than 50,000 associates and it operating across more than 145 markets with a workforce of around 50,000 employees, the division was valued at more than $30 billion.

=== Mars Food UK Limited ===
In 1932, Forrest Mars Sr. opened what was then Mars (Europe) headquarters, and remains Mars (UK) headquarters in Slough, Berkshire on the then-new Slough Trading Estate, after a disagreement with his father, Franklin Clarence Mars. In this factory, he produced the first Mars bar, based on the American Milky Way. The company branch is currently known as Mars Food UK Limited in the United Kingdom. Mars brands manufactured for the United Kingdom market but not for the United States include Tunes.

Many brands first created and sold in the United Kingdom were later introduced in the United States, including Starburst (original UK brand name Opal Fruits) and Skittles. The brands Twix and Topic were UK based.

Milky Way in Europe and worldwide is known as the 3 Musketeers in America. Similarly, the Snickers bar was previously marketed in Ireland and the United Kingdom as Marathon until 1990; in the UK, France, Germany and the Netherlands, also until 1990; Galaxy in the Middle East is known as Dove in America and worldwide. Chocolate and peanut M&M's were introduced in 1980s.

=== Mars Petcare ===
Forrest Mars started the pet food industry in Europe, and his Mars Candy Company bought Kal Kan. Forrest Mars changed the name of Kal Kan dog food to Pedigree, and Kal Kan cat food to Whiskas. As of 1991, Mars controlled 60 percent of the pet food market, both in volume and value. Whiskas was the number one brand. As of 1994, Mars was the leading pet food company worldwide with $4 billion in sales.

In February 2003, Mars acquired Aquarium Pharmaceuticals, Inc. (API, incorporated in 1964) and in 2007 it was renamed Mars Fishcare, Inc. The company manufactures and supplies home aquarium and pond products. Mars Fishcare brands include: Aquarium Pharmaceuticals (API), RENA, AQUARIAN, and PondCare.

The company introduced a genetic test for dogs using cheek swabs to identify breed breakdown, trait tests and health risks in 2007 known as Wisdom Panel. In 2018, Mars Petcare acquired Genoscoper Laboratories, a Finnish animal molecular diagnostics company, "to form the basis for future practical applications in enabling precision healthcare for pets" under its genetic testing unit, Wisdom Health. Wisdom Panel DNA testing expanded to include cats in mid 2021.

In Australia, the division operates three sites that are located in Wodonga, Victoria (established in 1967 for manufacture of wet pet food); Bathurst, New South Wales (established in the 1980s for manufacture of dry pet food); and Brisbane, Queensland (for manufacture of birdcare products).

Mars Petcare manufactures the 'Trill' birdseed range.

==== Mars Veterinary Health ====
In 2007, Mars, Incorporated purchased a significant stake in the Banfield Pet Hospital chain. In October 2015, BluePearl Veterinary Partners was acquired by Mars Petcare division. This acquisition resulted in Mars Petcare becoming the largest pet nutrition and veterinary care provider in the world. In January 2017, Mars Veterinary Health North America announced the US$7.7 billion acquisition of Los Angeles-based animal hospital chain VCA Inc. In June 2018, Mars Veterinary Health International and Diagnostics acquired the Linnaeus Group consolidating its position as a leading veterinary provider in the United Kingdom.

Veterinary services are as follows:

Mars Veterinary Health North America:

- Banfield Pet Hospital – 1,054 sites
- BluePearl Veterinary Partners – 61 sites
- Pet Partners – 86 sites
- VCA Animal Hospitals – 917 sites

Mars Veterinary Health International:

- AniCura – 280 sites
- Antech Diagnostics / Sound
- Asia Veterinary Diagnostics
- Linnaeus Veterinary Group – 148 sites
- Mount Pleasant Veterinary Group
- Veterinary Emergency & Specialty (VES) Hospital Singapore
- VSH Hong Kong

=== Former ===
==== Mars Drinks UK ====
Mars Drinks UK, the beverages division of Mars Limited, operates from Slough in Berkshire and specializes in office vending machines. Mars Drinks UK comprises the FLAVIA and KLIX brands which offer branded drinks such as the Starburst Orange Drink, the Maltesers Hot Chocolate and the Galaxy drinks.

Mars Drinks also produces coffee and the equipment used to make it. In 1982 FLAVIA was created out of the high demand for coffee in the United Kingdom. Initially marketed as Dimension 3 until 1989, FLAVIA was introduced in France and Germany in 1986 and Japan in 1992 then brought to the United States in 1996 and to Canada in 1997. Other products such as cappuccino were introduced in 2002 and tea in 2004.

In 2018, the Drinks division was sold to Lavazza.

== Factories ==
In 1963, a large factory was opened in Veghel in the Netherlands. This factory has currently the biggest production volume of Mars factories and is one of the biggest chocolate factories in the world. Most confectionery products for Europe were produced in Slough and Veghel. The two factories in Slough were located on Liverpool Road and Dundee Road; the one on Liverpool Road closed in 2007, with Twix production moving to the Netherlands and Starburst production moving to the Czech Republic.

The major production plant for Mars confectionery products in Australia is in Ballarat, Victoria.

There is one factory outside of Hershey, Pennsylvania, located in Elizabethtown, Pennsylvania. The factory in Chicago, Illinois, has its own commuter rail station, simply named Mars. The company announced in early 2022 that it intends to close the Chicago factory in 2024. The building will remain in the hands of Chicago's Galewood neighborhood residents.

== Brands ==
Many Mars products are household, famous-name brands. Some of these product lines are manufactured by Mars; others are manufactured by The Wrigley Company.

=== Original food products ===
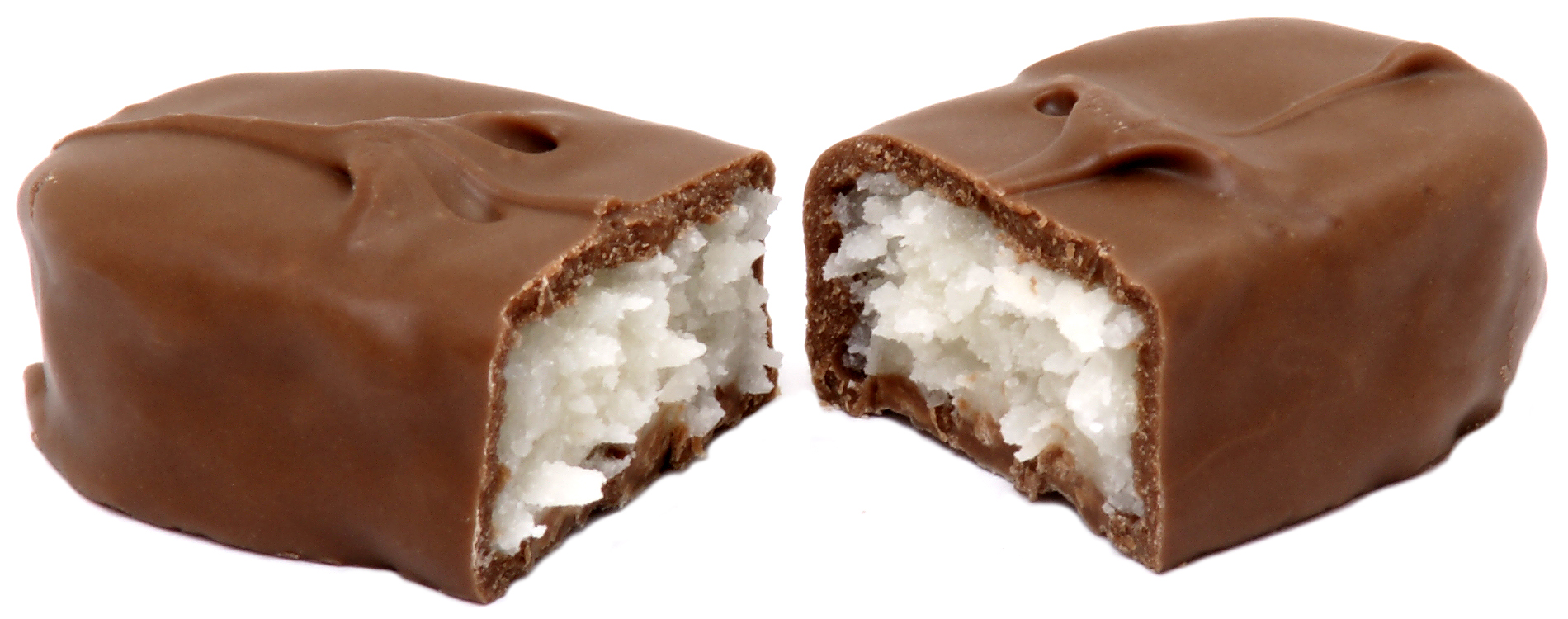
Bounty

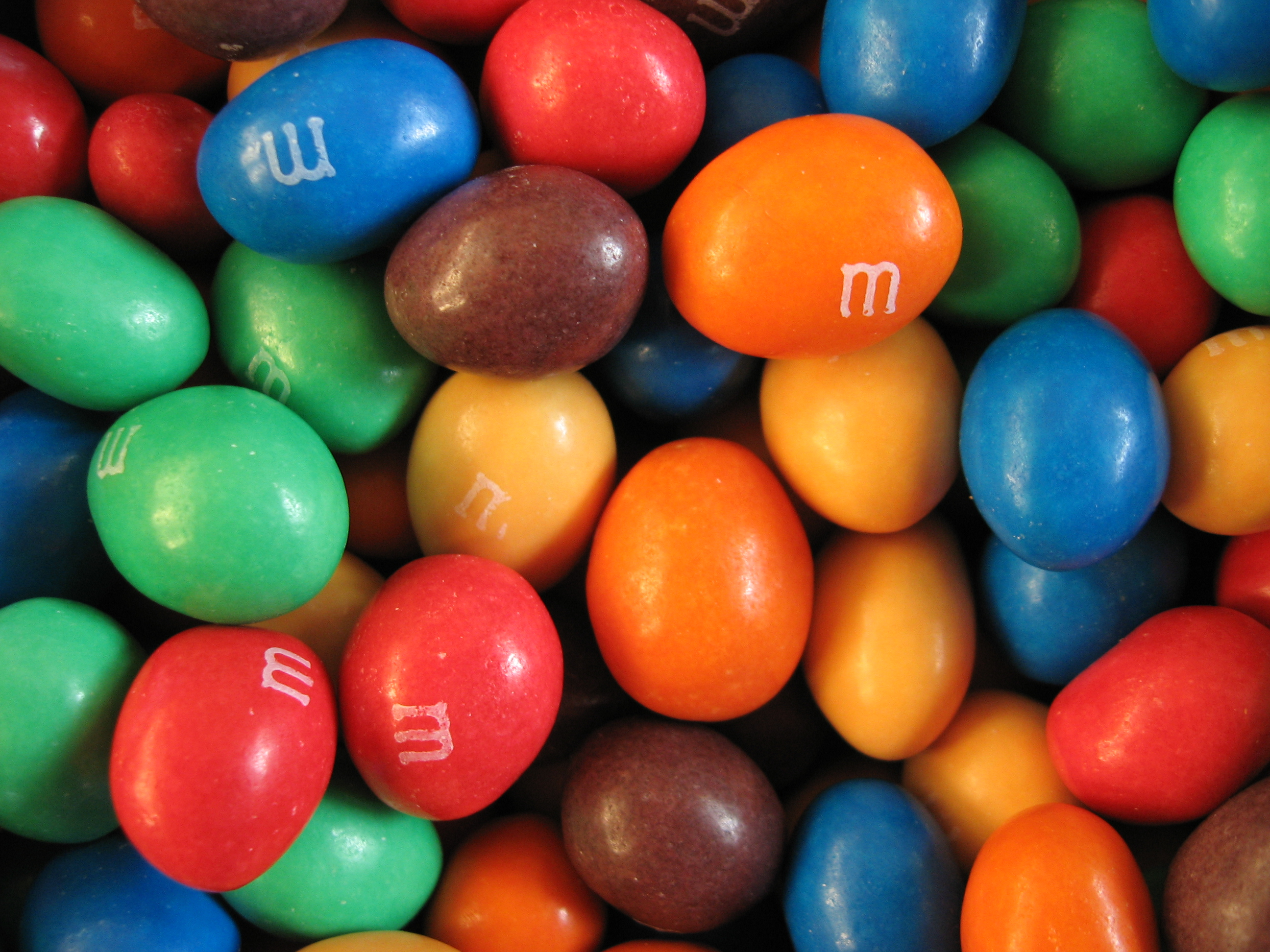
M&M's

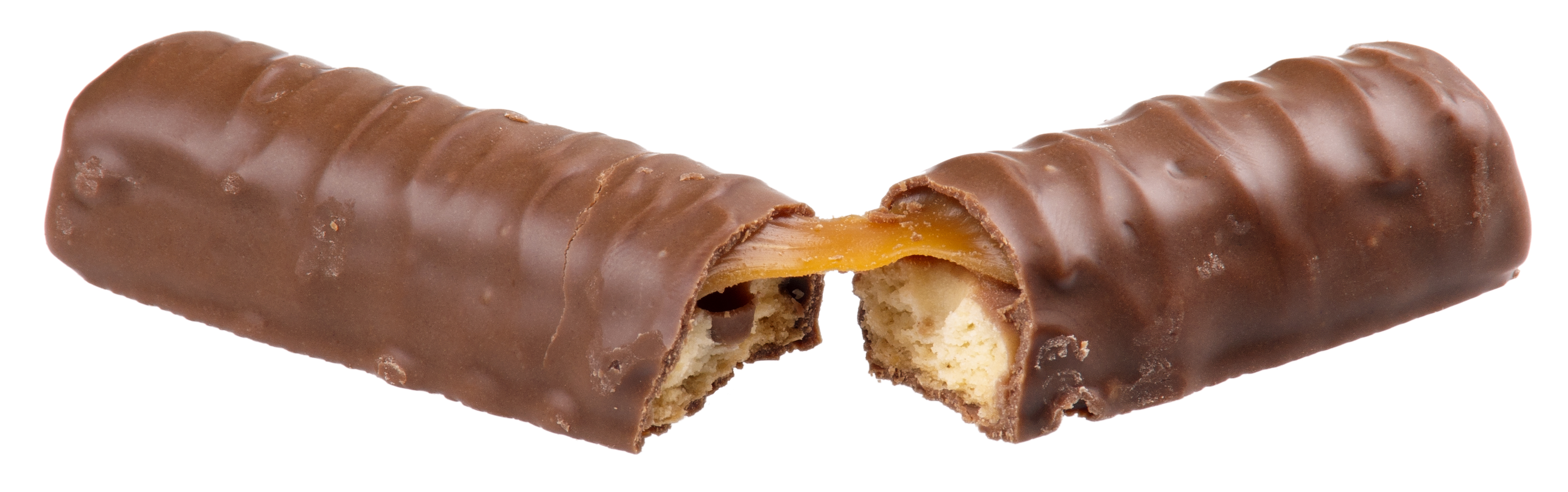
Twix

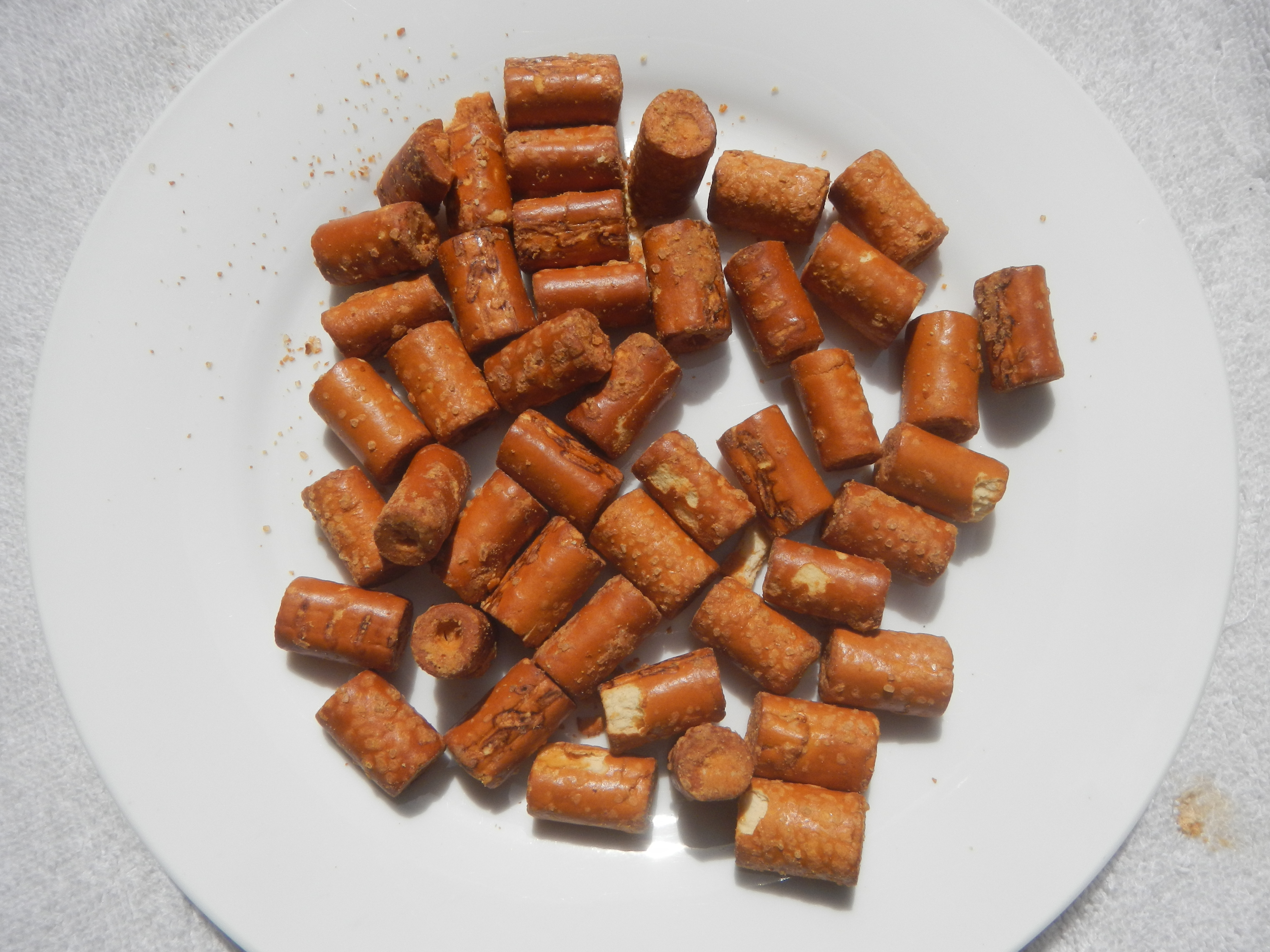
Combos

- 3 Musketeers
- Ben's Original
- Bounty
- Celebrations
- Cirku
- CocoaVia
- Combos
- Dolmio
- Dove
- Ebly
- Ethel M
- FLAVIA
- Foodspring
- Galaxy
- Galaxy Bubbles
- Galaxy Minstrels
- Kan Tong
- M&M's
- MasterFoods
- Maltesers
- Marathon
- Mars
- Milky Way
- Munch
- Promite
- Revels
- Seeds of Change
- Snickers
- Tracker
- Twix

==== Confectionery products ====
Note: manufactured by Wrigley Company

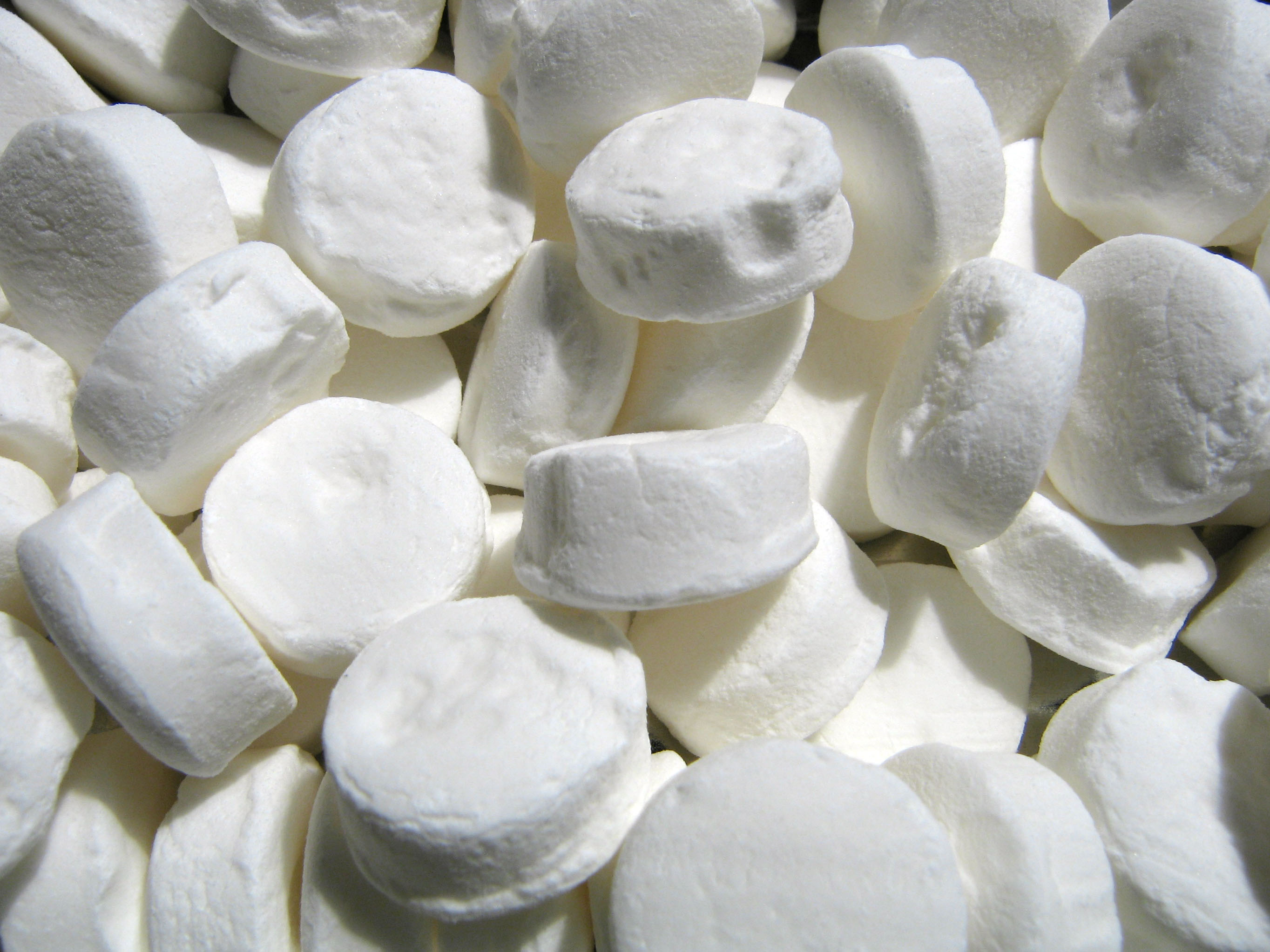
Altoids mints

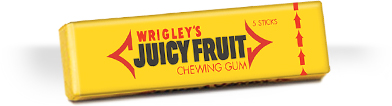
Juicy Fruit gum

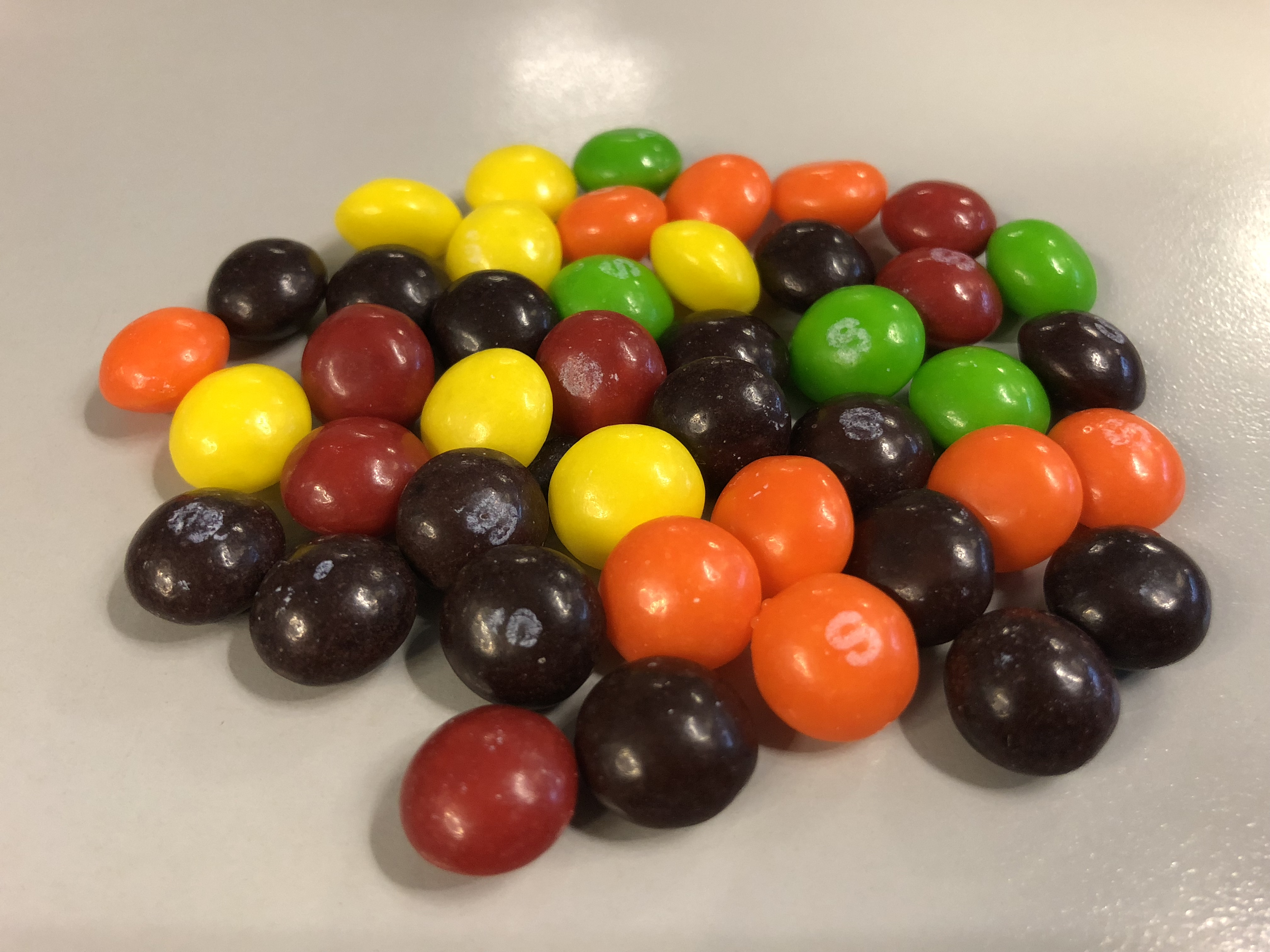
Skittles candy

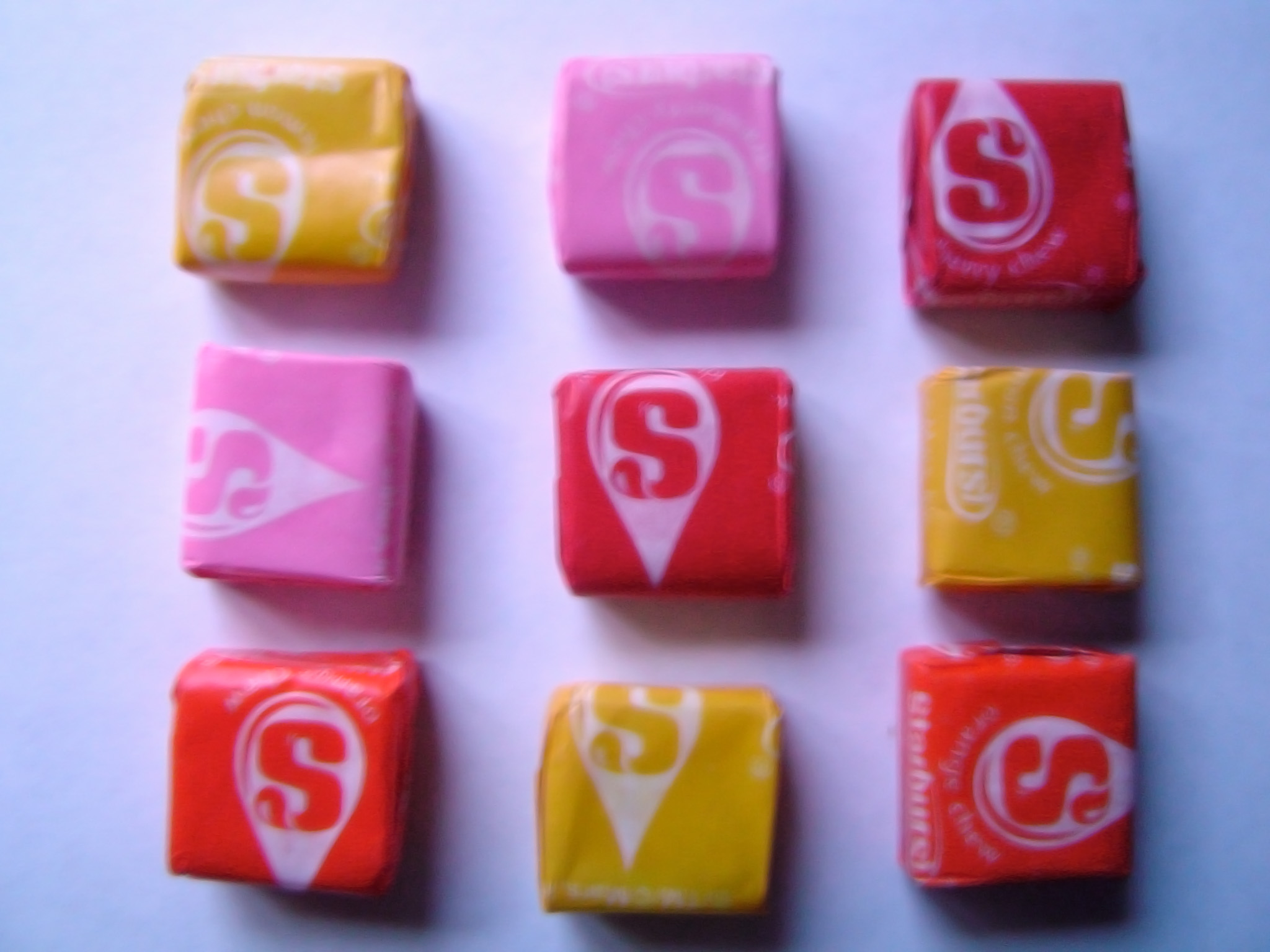
Starburst candy

- 5 (gum)
- Airwaves
- Altoids
- Big Red
- Bubble Tape
- Doublemint
- Eclipse
- Eclipse Ice
- Excel
- Extra
- Freedent
- Hubba Bubba
- Juicy Fruit
- Life Savers
- Lockets
- Orbit
- Ouch!
- Rondo
- Skittles
- Spearmint
- Starburst
- Sugus
- Surpass
- Tunes
- Winterfresh
- Wrigley's

=== Products for pet consumption ===
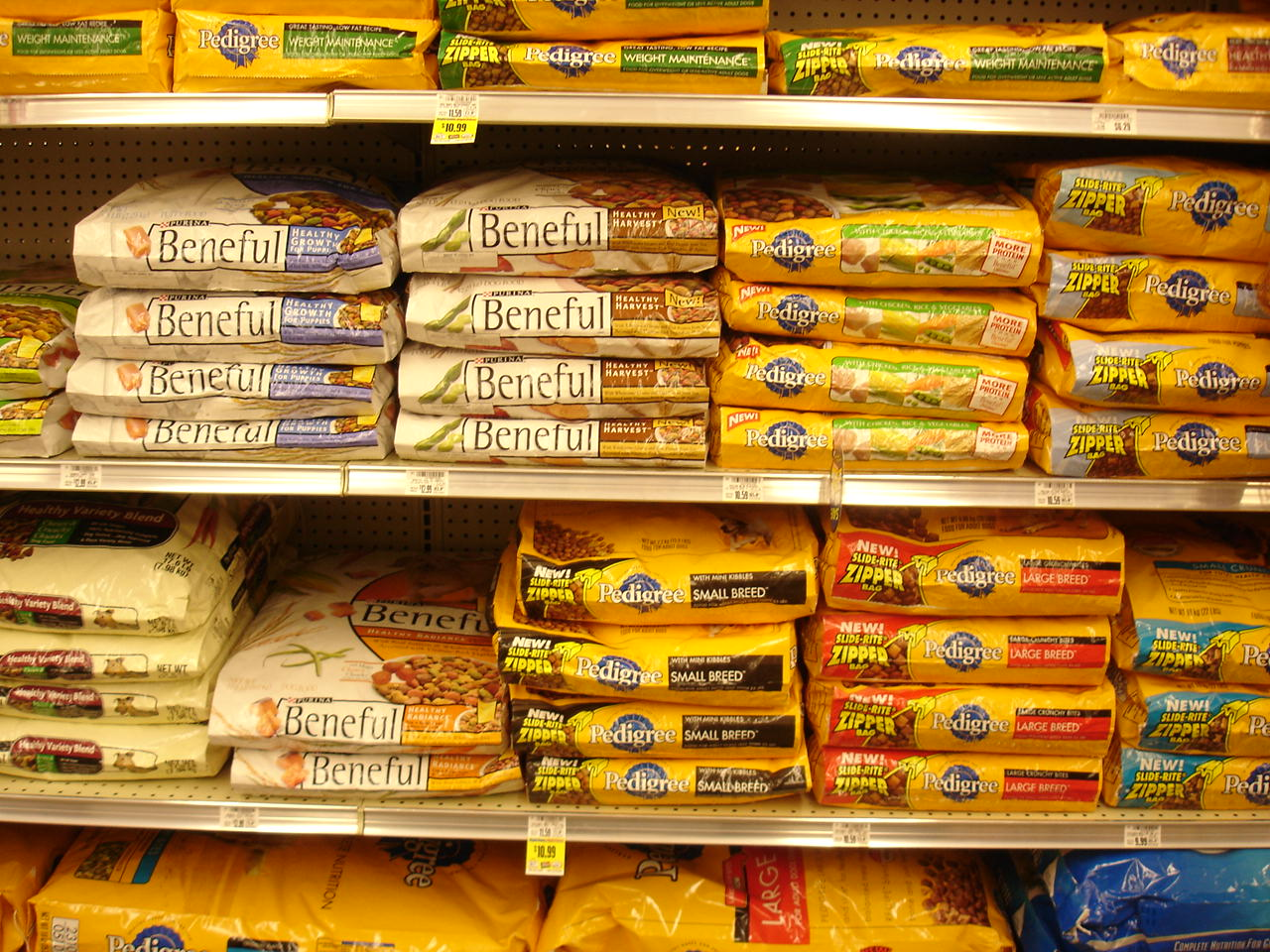
Bags of Beneful and Pedigree

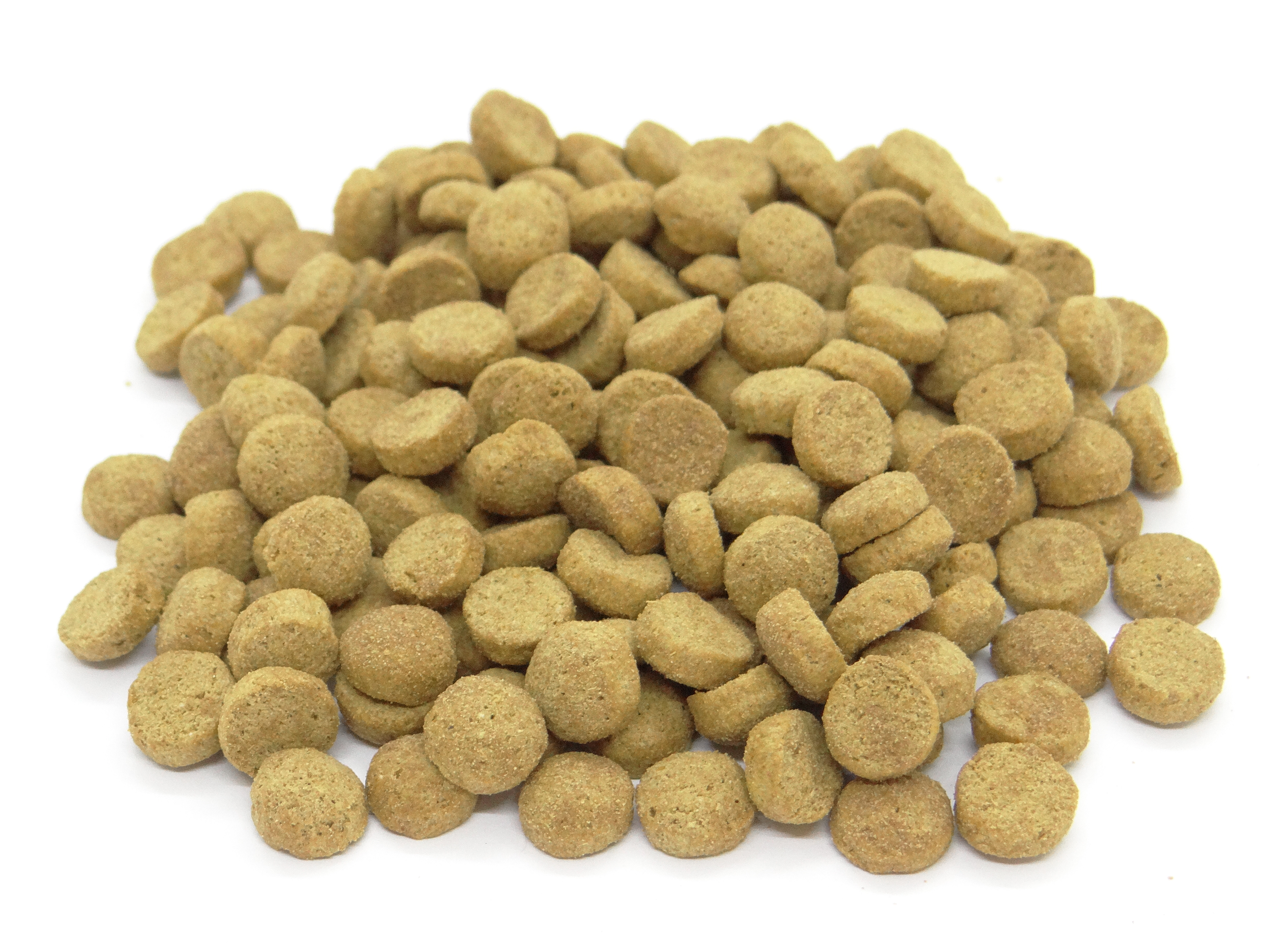
Royal Canin cat food

- Buckeye Nutrition
- Eukanuba
- The Goodlife Recipe
- Iams
- Nutro Products
- Cesar
- Pedigree
- Royal Canin
- Sheba
- Whiskas

=== Discontinued product lines ===
- Banjo Candy Bar
- Bisc &
- Cookies &
- Flyte
- Kudos
- Lucas Candy
- M-Azing
- Pacers
- PB Max
- Spangles
- Summit Cookie Bars
- Topic
- Treets

== Awards and honors ==
The company was named by Fortune magazine as one of the top 100 companies to work for in 2013, citing the example that employees of the pet food division can take their dogs to work.

The company has made donations to Elizabethtown College, which includes a room sponsored by them and a weekly executive lecture series.

Year	Association	Category	Nominee(s)	Result
2017	Diversity in Media Awards	Marketing Campaign of the Year	Maltesers - Dance Floor (TV Advert)	Nominated
2020	Vet Help Direct	Best Vet in the United Kingdom 2020	Willows Veterinary Centre and Referral Service (part of Linnaeus Group)	Won

== Consumer relations ==
Mars remains a family business owned by the Mars family. The company is famous for its secrecy. A 1993 Washington Post Magazine article was a rare raising of the veil, as the reporter was able to see the "M"s being applied to the M&M's, something that "no outsider had ever before been invited to observe". In 1999, for example, the company did not acknowledge that Forrest Mars Sr. had died or that he had worked for the company. As of 2019, the company had "aggressively" moved away from its model of secrecy through the media and sponsorships.

== Controversies ==
=== Climate change ===
In 2025, Mars and other major food manufacturers were named in a report by the NewClimate Institute and Carbon Market Watch for failing to set a methane emissions reduction target or shift away from animal-based protein, and overstating progress by relying on greenhouse gas removal rather than source reduction. The report also noted that Mars had failed to establish a timeline to source only deforestation-free cocoa.

=== Unethical treatment of animals ===
In 2007, Mars came under criticism from People for the Ethical Treatment of Animals (PETA) for funding laboratory experiments on mice, rats, guinea pigs and rabbits, which the group alleges are inhumane and in violation of the company's own policies prohibiting experiments on animals.

One study was conducted in collaboration with the Salk Institute regarding angiogenesis and spatial memory, in which mice were given an ad-lib diet that included epicatechin, plant-derived flavonoid. One of the experiments involved groups of control and experimental animals, the latter of which were housed individually in cages that included a running wheel for optional exercise for two hours a day. The former, also housed individually, did not have access to a running wheel. Another experiment was the classical spatial memory assay, the Morris water maze, in which experimenters had mice swim in water mixed with white paint that concealed the water depth. The study, which Mars contends was legally required in order for the company to make flavonoid-related health claims, showed that the inclusion of epicatechin in the diet improved memory and angiogenesis, more so if coupled with exercise.

=== Child labor and slave labor ===
Mars has been criticized for buying cocoa beans from West African farmers who reportedly use unpaid or poorly paid child laborers. In 2009, Mars announced that the company would work towards only purchasing cocoa from suppliers who meet environmental, labor, and production standards. TransFair USA, an organization which certifies products as Fair Trade, applauded the move and expressed hope that it would include a provision for fair wages for laborers and farmers. In 2010, Mars Inc. received the U.S. Secretary of State's Award for Corporate Excellence. In April 2010, Mars launched the MyCocoaPaper initiative, which claims to provide economic opportunities to women and families in Indonesia by making paper products out of cocoa bark and recycled office paper.

In 2011, Mars and Fairtrade International announced an agreement to introduce the first Fairtrade labeled Mars product and to work together to enable farmers to have sustainable livelihoods and substantially increased productivity. The first Mars product to carry the Fairtrade mark was Maltesers, which appeared in stores in 2012 in the UK and Ireland.

In 2019, Mars announced that they could not guarantee that their chocolate products were free from child slave labor, as they could trace only 24% of their purchasing back to the farm level (see below). The Washington Post noted that the commitment taken in 2001 to eradicate such practices within 4 years had not been kept, neither at the due deadline of 2005, nor within the revised deadlines of 2008 and 2010, and that the result was not likely to be achieved for 2020 either.

In 2021, Mars was named in a class action lawsuit filed by eight former child slaves from Mali who alleged that the company aided and abetted their enslavement on cocoa plantations in Ivory Coast. The suit accused Mars (along with Nestlé, Cargill, Barry Callebaut, Olam International, the Hershey Company, and Mondelez International) of knowingly engaging in forced labor, and the plaintiffs sought damages for unjust enrichment, negligent supervision, and intentional infliction of emotional distress. In June 2021, the United States Supreme Court dismissed the lawsuit on the grounds that as the abuse had happened outside the United States, the group did not have standing to file such a lawsuit.

Mars scored a yellow rating, the second highest of four possible scores, "Starting to implement good policies", on the 2022 Chocolate Scorecard, which rates all the large chocolate companies on their record in eliminating child labour, providing a living income to cocoa farmers and traceability/transparency. In its own scorecard on human rights and environmental credentials, Mars states that it has traced the source of their cocoa to 132,000 of the farms that supply their cocoa.

A CBS television news investigation in 2023 found children as young as five years old working in the Ghana supply chain of Mars to harvest cocoa for brands such as Snickers and M&Ms.

=== Deforestation in African national parks ===
In September 2017, an investigation conducted by NGO Mighty Earth found that a large amount of the cocoa used in chocolate produced by Mars and other major chocolate companies was grown illegally in national parks and other protected areas in Ivory Coast and Ghana. The countries are the world's two largest cocoa producers.

The report documents show, in several national parks and other protected areas, 90% or more of the land mass has been converted to cocoa. Less than four percent of Ivory Coast remains densely forested, and the chocolate companies' laissez-faire approach to sourcing has driven extensive deforestation in Ghana as well. In Ivory Coast, deforestation has pushed chimpanzees into just a few small pockets, and reduced the country's elephant population from several hundred thousand to about 200–400.

On the 2022 Chocolate Scorecard, Mars scored the second highest of four possible scores for "Deforestation and Climate" and "Agroforestry", "starting to implement good policies". Mars scored a lower rating (third of the four) for "Agrochemical Management", "needs more work on policy and implementation".

== See also ==
- Big Chocolate
- List of food companies
