= Tracker (granola bar) =

Chewy cereal bar

Tracker is a chewy cereal bar manufactured by Mars, Incorporated, which has been sold in the UK and Ireland since the 1980s. The same product is sold in other parts of Europe under the manufacturers' Balisto brand.

Trackers come in seven flavours: Crunchy Peanut, Chocolate Chip, White Chocolate Chip, Roasted Nut, Raisin, Burst of Berries and Tangy Lemon. Of these varieties, the first two are sold under the Balisto brand in Switzerland, while three varieties are reportedly "certified" by the producer as kosher.

The bars are individually wrapped, and are sold individually or (in some the case of some varieties) can be bought in multi-pack grocery boxes.

As of 2002, Mars' Tracker brand reportedly had an 11% market of the UK cereal bar market, behind Kellogg's Nutri-Grain and Special K products.
