= Summit Cookie Bars =

Candy bar brand

Summit was a candy bar manufactured in the early 1980s by Mars in the United States. Labeled "cookie bars" on the packaging, but "candy bars" in some advertising, they consisted of two wafers covered with peanuts, all coated in chocolate.

In 1983, Mars changed to individual foil wrapping and promoted the bar as having 30% more chocolate. Consumer panelists said the modifications were more gimmicky than substantive. The new bar was longer, thinner, and firmer, and received mediocre reviews. Keeping the bar from melting was noted as a problem. Despite an ambitious marketing effort toward the Black population in the United States (including a partnership with Kentucky Fried Chicken as well as lobbying to make Summit bars eligible for purchase via EBT cards), sales remained flat. Production of the bar was halted and it is no longer available.
