= Surpass =

Brand of antacid chewing gum, 2001–2003

- Product type: Antacid chewing gum
- Current owner: Mars, Inc.
- Produced by: Wrigley Company
- Introduced: 2001
- Discontinued: 2003; 23 years ago

Surpass was a Wrigley antacid gum.

== Description ==
Surpass was a brand of chewing gum released by Wrigley Healthcare. It was marketed as an antacid gum intended to treat heartburn.

== History ==
Wrigley Healthcare began shipping the gum on February 19, 2001. Sales were below the company's expectations. Shipments of Surpass to retail outlets were discontinued in March 2003 due to lack of popularity.
