= Kudos (granola bar) =

Brand of granola bar

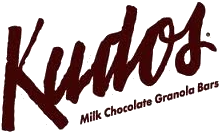
- Product type: Granola
- Current owner: Mars, Inc.
- Introduced: 1986
- Discontinued: 2017; 9 years ago

Kudos
Nutritional value per 1 bar (24 g)
- Energy: 0.42 kJ (0.10 kcal)
- Carbohydrates: 17 g
- Sugars: 8 g
- Dietary fiber: 1 g
- Fat: 2.5 g
- Saturated: 1.5 g
- Trans: 0 g
- Protein: 1 g
Vitamins and minerals
Minerals	Quantity %DV^{†}
Sodium	5% 110 mg
- Facts given are for the Dove variation.
- ^{†}Percentages estimated using US recommendations for adults.

Kudos was a brand of milk chocolate granola cereal bar produced by Mars, Incorporated.

When initially launched in 1986, there were three varieties: nutty fudge, chocolate chip, and peanut butter. Other future flavors would include bits of Mars candy including Snickers, M&Ms, and Dove chocolate. The original formulation of the bar was much more candy bar-like with less focus on the granola, although the original intention was to offer a healthier candy bar alternative.

The original slogan was "Kudos, I'm yours!"

Mars, Incorporated, stated in a 2017 Facebook post that the bars had officially been discontinued. As of 2020, there were no plans to revive the product.
