= Topic (chocolate bar) =

1962–2021 chocolate bar by Mars

Topic wrapper

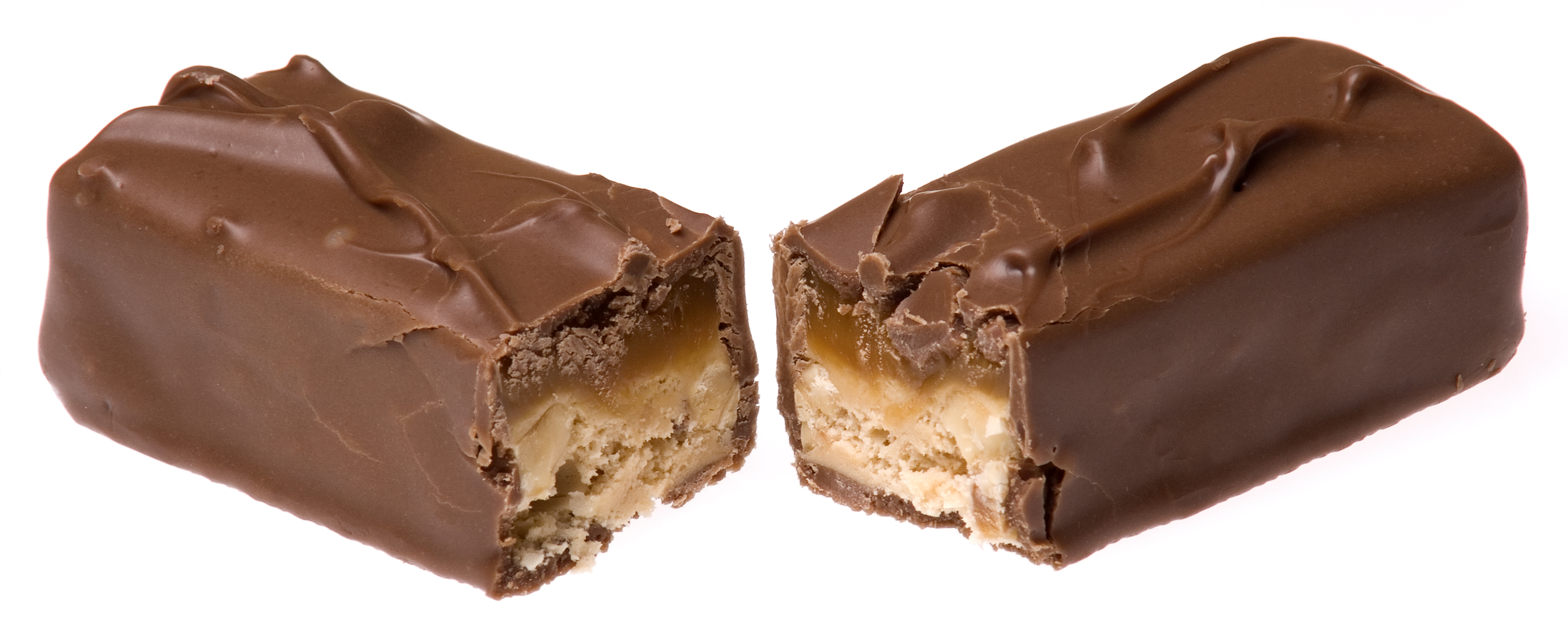
A Topic bar split in half

Topic was a chocolate bar made by Mars, Incorporated in France and sold throughout Europe. It contained hazelnuts, nougat and caramel, coated in milk chocolate.

The Topic bar was first introduced in 1962 by Mars, Incorporated. It was marketed as a premium nut-based chocolate bar, with the tagline "A Hazelnut in Every Bite" used prominently in UK advertising campaigns during the 1970s and 1980s.

The bar featured a distinctive red wrapper with bold white lettering. Its combination of nougat, caramel, and hazelnuts was intended to appeal to customers who preferred nutty confectionery. The bar was typically sold individually, but also appeared in multi-packs and variety boxes.

In 2002, Topic was promoted through a series of radio advertisements with the strapline "A joy to eat, but a bitch to make". These ads featured British actors Simon Pegg and Mark Heap, known for their roles in the cult TV comedy Spaced. The campaign was noted for its humorous and irreverent tone, which helped revive interest in the brand among younger consumers.

In 1997, a Topic bar was found to contain the remains of a mouse. A subsequent investigation revealed that the contamination originated from a supplier in Turkey. The UK courts ruled that Mars could not be held negligent under the Food Safety Act, as the company had exercised due diligence in inspecting the supplier's operations.

The Topic bar was removed from boxes of Celebrations in 2006, alongside Twix, although Twix was later reintroduced. Topic remained available as a standalone product until 2021, when Mars quietly discontinued it due to declining sales and shifting consumer preferences. Despite its discontinuation, Topic is frequently mentioned in retrospectives of discontinued British sweets, alongside other popular discontinued chocolate bars such as the Aztec bar and Fry's Five Centre. Topic's long-standing presence in the UK and European markets made it a familiar sight in corner shops and supermarkets for nearly six decades. Its nutty profile distinguished it from other Mars offerings, and its inclusion in Celebrations boxes helped cement its place in British confectionery culture.

== See also ==
- List of chocolate bar brands
- Celebrations
- Mars, Incorporated
