= PB Max =

Candy bar

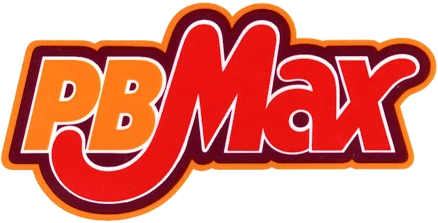
- Product type: Candy bar
- Current owner: Mars, Incorporated
- Country: United States
- Introduced: 1989
- Discontinued: 1994; 32 years ago
- Related brands: Snickers, Twix, Reese's Peanut Butter Cups

PB Max is a discontinued brand of candy bar made in the United States by Mars, launched in 1989 or 1990. They were made of creamy peanut butter over a square-shaped whole grain cookie, enrobed in milk chocolate with crunchy round cookie pieces.

The peanut butter in PB Max was sweetened with sugar and hydrogenated vegetable oil to prevent separation. The label's serving suggestion was "1 piece" weighing 42 g, containing 240 calories, 5 g protein, 20 g carbohydrates, 16 g fat, and 150 mg sodium.

Early television commercials for PB Max declared that the "PB" in its name didn't stand for things such as piggy banks, polka band, portly ballerina, platinum blonde, penguin black belt, pig basketball, plow boy, pure bliss, parachuting buffalo, or pink baboon — but that it, in fact, stood for peanut butter.

According to former Mars executive Alfred Poe, PB Max was discontinued due to the Mars family's distaste for peanut butter despite $50 million in sales. In April 2009, Mars would bring back PB Max for a limited time. The re-release data is very obscure.

== Ingredients ==
Peanut butter (peanuts, sugar, hydrogenated vegetable oil, salt), milk chocolate (sugar, cocoa butter, milk, chocolate, soy lecithin, vanillin), partially hydrogenated vegetable oil (canola, soybean and cottonseed), oats, flour, sugar, mono and diglycerides, baking soda, high fructose corn syrup, TBHQ.

== See also ==
- List of peanut dishes
