= Nutro Products =

Pet food manufacturer

The Nutro Company
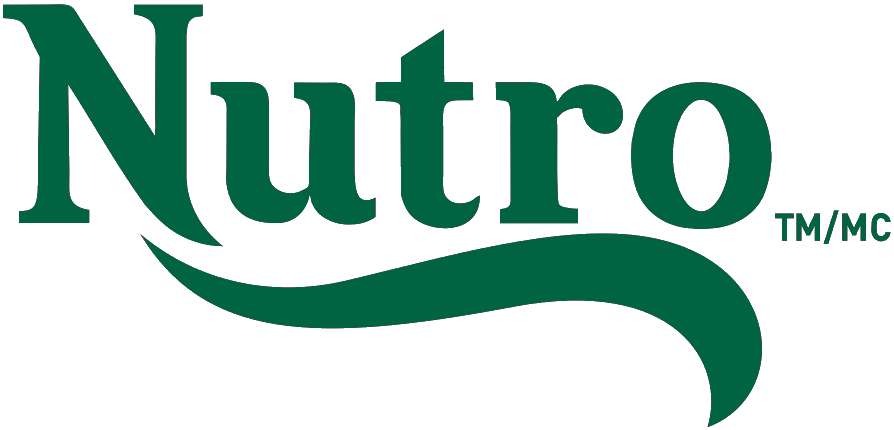
- Type: Private fully owned subsidiary
- Industry: Food
- Founded: 1926; 100 years ago as Nutro Products in Industry, California, US
- Founder: Herben Serois
- Headquarters: Franklin, Tennessee, US
- Area served: Asia, Australia, Canada, Europe, New Zealand and US
- Products: Pet food
- Brands: Crave; Max; Ultra; Wild Frontier; Wholesome Essentials
- Parent: Mars, Incorporated (2007–present)
- Website: nutro.com

The Nutro Company, Inc. is an American manufacturer of pet food. The company, a subsidiary of Mars, Incorporated since 2007, is the developer and manufacturer of the Max, Wholesome Essentials, Ultra, Wild Frontier, and Crave brands of dog and cat food, as well as Greenies dental treats. The company is headquartered in Franklin, Tennessee, US.

== History ==
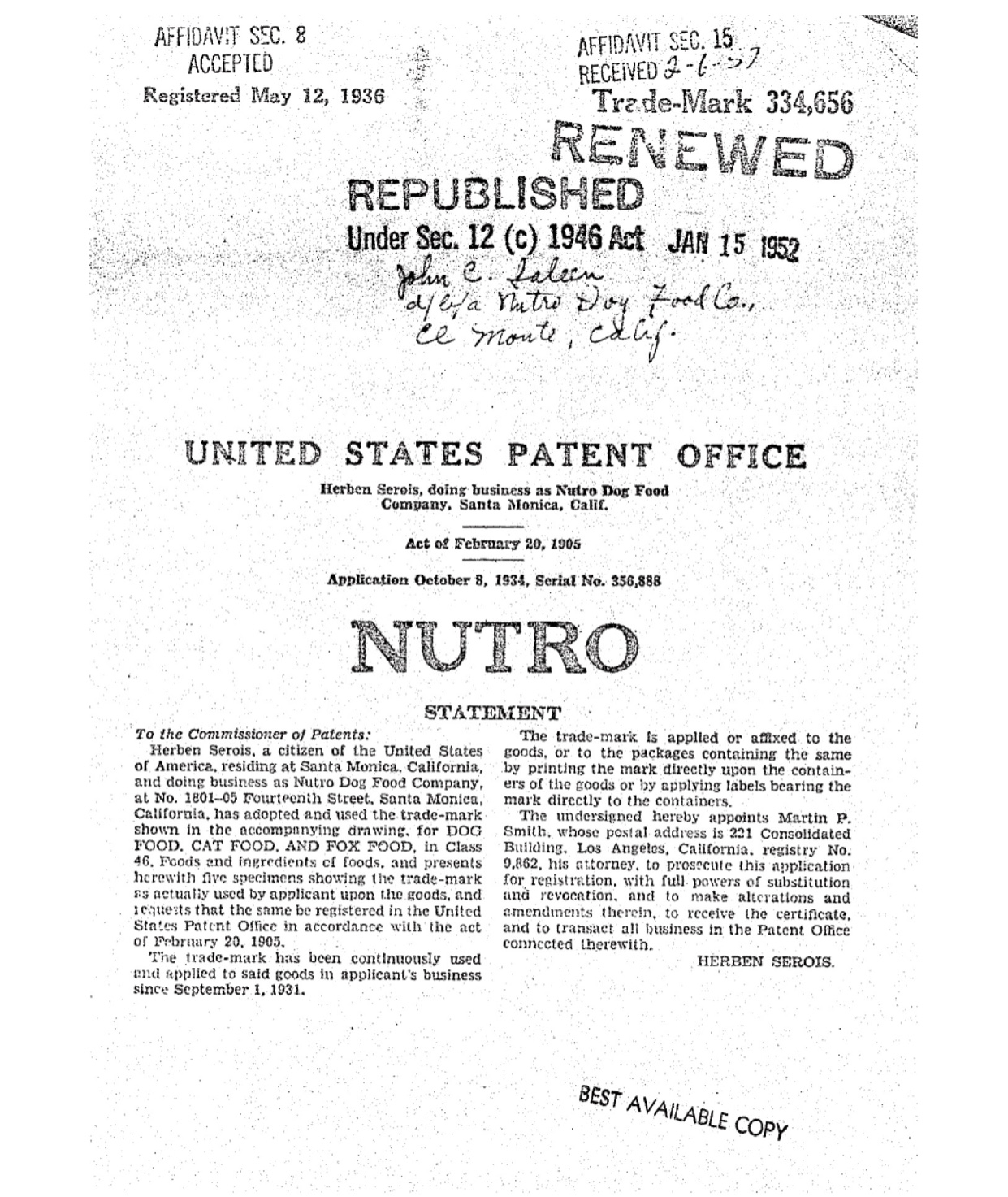
Nutro trademark, 1931

The Nutro brand began in 1926 when Herben Serois started the company, which was then purchased by the Saleen brothers in 1933. John, Herman, and Albert Saleen owned and operated a fox farm where they raised foxes and developed their own fox food. They also developed wet dog food which they distributed through Kal Kan. John took over the business in 1947.

According to the United States Patent and Trademark Office, John Saleen renewed the Nutro Dog Food Company trademark in 1952 from the family of Herben Serois, who had received approval to use the trademark Nutro on May 12, 1936.

Stephen Saleen, the oldest of three children attended USC, graduating in 1971. He participated more and more in the family business, making the food, conducting deliveries, and sales. He was instrumental in developing formal marketing ideas and designing the layout of individual stores for maximum efficiency. Steve also came up with the modern Nutro logo (prior iteration to the current one used by Mars Inc.).

Over the years, Steve grew passionate about cars and racing. Between his passions for pet food and cars, pet food eventually waned, and he started his own car modification company, "Saleen Autosport" in 1983.

John Saleen eventually realized his children did not have the same calling to continue with Nutro so he sold his business to a friend, Ed Brown, for $300,000 in 1975.

In 1985, with the help of Dr. Sharon Machlik, they developed and introduced their Max line of foods, which made use of a chicken, lamb and rice formulation. Instead of traditional advertising, the company chose to produce large amounts of literature on the dietary needs of dogs and cats with comparative information on their ingredients versus the ingredients of other brands, and provide this to their retailers as a marketing tool.

The company was acquired by Mars, Incorporated in 2007 and the headquarters was moved to Tennessee.

== Products ==
Nutro develops several different diet formulations, including canned, soft foods as well as bagged, dry kibbles. They have Max Cat and Natural Choice lines for cats, and the Nutro Max, Natural Choice, and Ultra lines for dogs. Each line has a selection of flavors and formulations for age range. The Ultra line was specifically created with the intent of creating a high-end holistic dog food.

Nutro dry foods are made through an extrusion process, and packaged with vitamin E as a natural preservative.

In 2006, it was announced that Nutro's Adult Lamb and Rice formula had become the #1 lamb and rice dog food in America. This earned the company a blue ribbon on their food.

== Food safety and criticism ==
In 1998, two samples of Nutro Premium (together with various other brands) were subject to qualitative analyses for pentobarbital residue by the U.S. Food and Drug Administration Center for Veterinary Medicine (CVM) due to suspicion that the anesthetizing drug may have found its way into pet foods through euthanized animals, including cats and dogs. DNA test for all the samples failed to detect cat and dog DNA but Nutro's two samples tested positive for the drug, presumably from rendered cattle. The CVM stated that due to the low level of exposure, the risk of adverse effects is low.

In March 2007, Nutro was listed as a company affected by the Menu Foods recall.

In April 2008, consumeraffairs.com reported multiple cases of diarrhea, vomiting and other intestinal problems in pets fed Nutro products. Nutro stated that their products undergo rigorous safety testing and are 100% safe. Some customers have backed the company, saying that their pets are not having any problems with the food. Veterinarians interviewed stated that it might not necessarily be the food that is causing problems. In September 2008, the Pet Food Product Safety Alliance (PFPSA) tested samples of Nutro dog food in response to the consumer complaints on consumeraffairs.com and found levels of copper in excess of Association of American Feed Control Officials (AAFCO) recommendations. Zinc levels were approximately 2–4 times the minimum recommendation of 120 ppm, but still within the maximum recommendation of 1000 ppm. The PFPSA has criticized the recommended zinc levels as excessive; even the minimum recommended levels are 10 times that of adult human requirements (based on body weight). PFPSA has also stated that the symptoms of zinc toxicity are consistent with consumer complaints regarding Nutro dog food. Nutro rejected PFPSA's claims stating that both zinc and copper levels were within recommended levels, reiterating that their products undergo "rigorous quality assurance testing".

In May 2009, Nutro issued a recall of selected dry cat food due to excess levels of zinc and low levels of potassium, which the company blamed on a production error by a premix company. Nutro stated that it received no complaints related to the recall. Symptoms includes "reduction in appetite, refusal of food, weight loss, vomiting or diarrhea." Both consumeraffairs.com and PFPSA have claimed a link between this incident and earlier complaints and also questioned Nutro's claim of quality control and product testing. In June, lab tests of a sample of Nutro Max Cat Adult Roasted Chicken Flavor showed zinc levels at 2100 ppm. Dr. Stephen Hansen, a veterinary toxicologist and senior vice-president of Animal Health for the American Society for the Prevention of Cruelty to Animals (ASPCA) described the zinc levels as "awfully high". While he stated that the long-term effects of such levels are not known, he mentioned the possibility of "significant intestinal upset and liver and kidney damage." Unlike the 1000 ppm maximum for dog food, the cat food maximum set by AAFCO is 2000 ppm. In comparison, the European Union's maximum for all animal feed is 250 ppm, with a recommended maximum of 150 ppm.
