= Sheba (cat food) =

Brand of cat food

- Product type: Cat food
- Current owner: Mars, Inc.
- Country: Germany
- Introduced: 1982; 44 years ago
- Website: sheba.com

Sheba (from Arabic شبع šabiʿa = to become sated) is a German brand of canned cat food, currently produced by Mars, Incorporated. The brand was introduced in Hamburg in 1982.

In January 2011, Mars Petcare US announced that Sheba would be discontinued and thus would no longer be available for purchase in the United States. A special webpage explained that the decision was based on economic factors:

Although the SHEBA® PREMIUM CUTS® Dinners product line enjoyed a loyal following of consumers, in the current economic environment, and given Sheba Dinners high price point, we do not anticipate the U.S. customer base growing enough to compensate for import challenges that make production prohibitively expensive.

As of July 2012, Sheba became available again in the United States. However, it now came in pull-tab cans as opposed to the former plastic trays. The same year, the actress Eva Longoria represented the brand in a promotional television campaign.

In mid-2014, Sheba once again returned to plastic trays with its Perfect Portions line. One can of Sheba brand cat food contains two servings, but the consumer must manually separate the portions for their pet. The Perfect Portions line reintroduced the plastic packaging by splitting the contents of one can into two separate serving trays, thus eliminating the need for manual separation. The line is priced slightly higher than Sheba canned food.
