= Anicura =

European family of animal hospitals and clinics

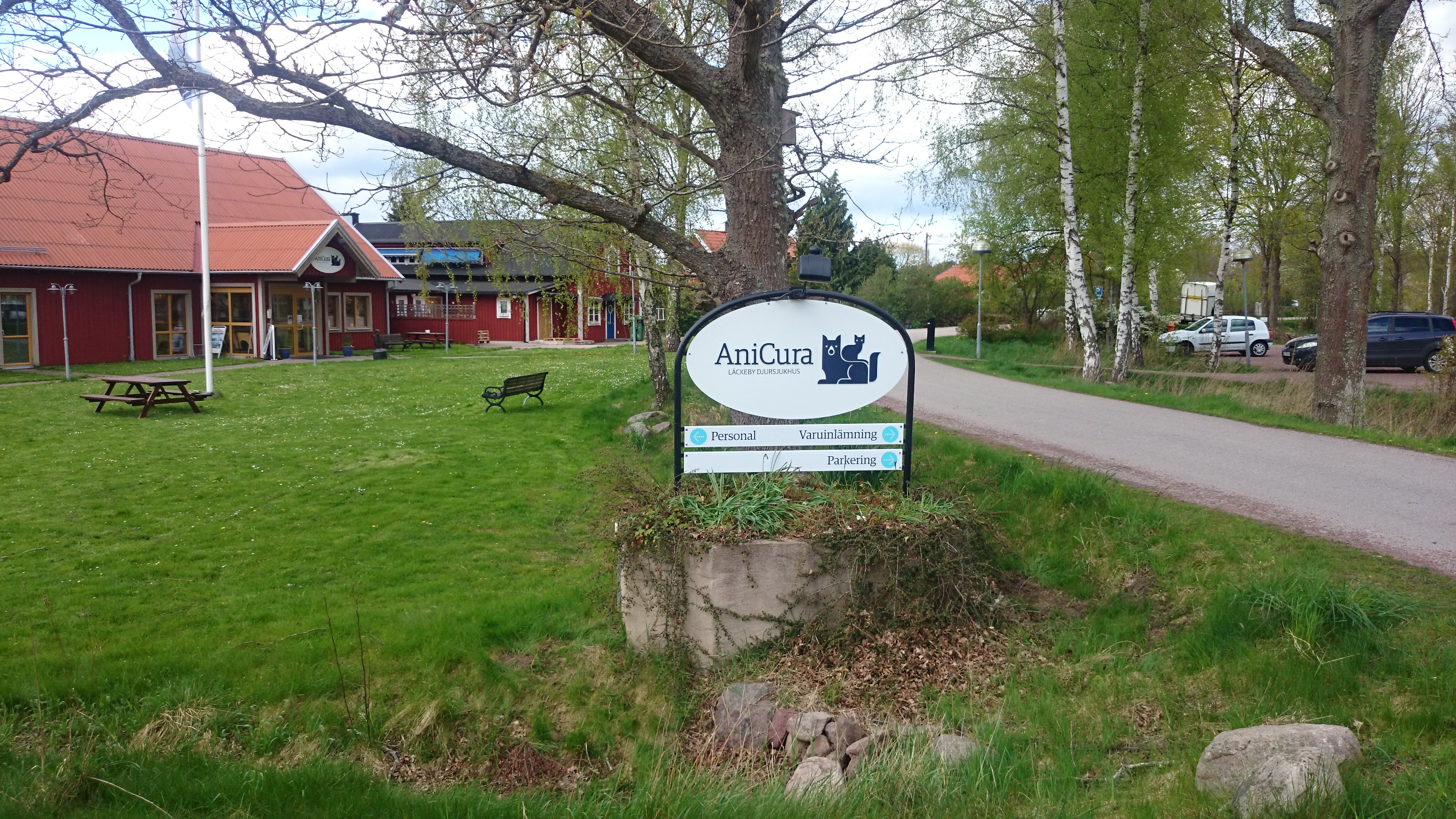
AniCura Animal Hospital

AniCura AB is a European family of animal hospitals and clinics focused on primary and specialized veterinary care for companion animals. AniCura AB has operations in Sweden, Norway, Denmark, Germany, Austria, Switzerland, the Netherlands, Spain, Italy, France, Belgium, Portugal, Andorra and Poland. The company comprises 450 animal hospitals and clinics that are visited by 3.6 million pets every year, mainly cats and dogs.

The total number of employees is approximately 11,000 of whom 4,000 are veterinarians and half have some form of specialist qualification, either national or international specialisation.

The company was established in 2011 as the first merger of companion animal hospitals in the Nordic region. Today, AniCura has an annual turnover of SEK 5.5 billion. The company’s head office is located in Danderyd in Stockholm. The vast majority of its animal hospitals and clinics specialize in specific subject areas such as internal medicine, surgery, orthopaedics, ophthalmology (eyes), neurology, dental medicine and dermatology. AniCura’s animal hospitals act as referral and training bodies for many surrounding animal hospitals and clinics.

The company offers medical and surgical veterinary services for dogs, cats and other pets. This includes preventive and basic care and advanced diagnostics such as endoscopy and magnetic resonance tomography, intensive care and orthopaedics. AniCura also provides rehabilitation, physiotherapy and dietary advice and offers selected animal foods and care products.

In 2013, AniCura's Scientific Council was established tasked with promoting research. It seeks to support and ensure that AniCura works with evidence-based methods according to scientific and empirical evidence. In 2015, AniCura established the AniCura Research Foundation to strengthen scientific and clinical veterinary research and development. The purpose of the foundation is to provide funds for research into veterinary medicine.

== History ==
AniCura grew out of the idea that shared resources create possibilities for better veterinary care. The company was established in 2011 as the first animal hospital conglomeration in the Nordic region.

2011 – AniCura established in Sweden.

2012 – AniCura established in Norway.

2013 – AniCura established in Denmark.

2015 – AniCura established in Germany, Austria and the Netherlands.

2016 - AniCura established in Switzerland.

2019 - AniCura established in Spain, France and Italy.

In 2015, one of Europe's oldest animal hospitals – AniCura Københavns Dyrehospital in Copenhagen, celebrates its centenary.

== Owner ==
AniCura is since 2018 part of Mars Petcare, a family-owned company focused on veterinary care and pet nutrition.

Nordic Capital sold its holding to Mars, Incorporated in June 2018. The business was valued at about €2 billion.
