= VCA Animal Hospitals =

Chain of animal hospitals

VCA, Inc.

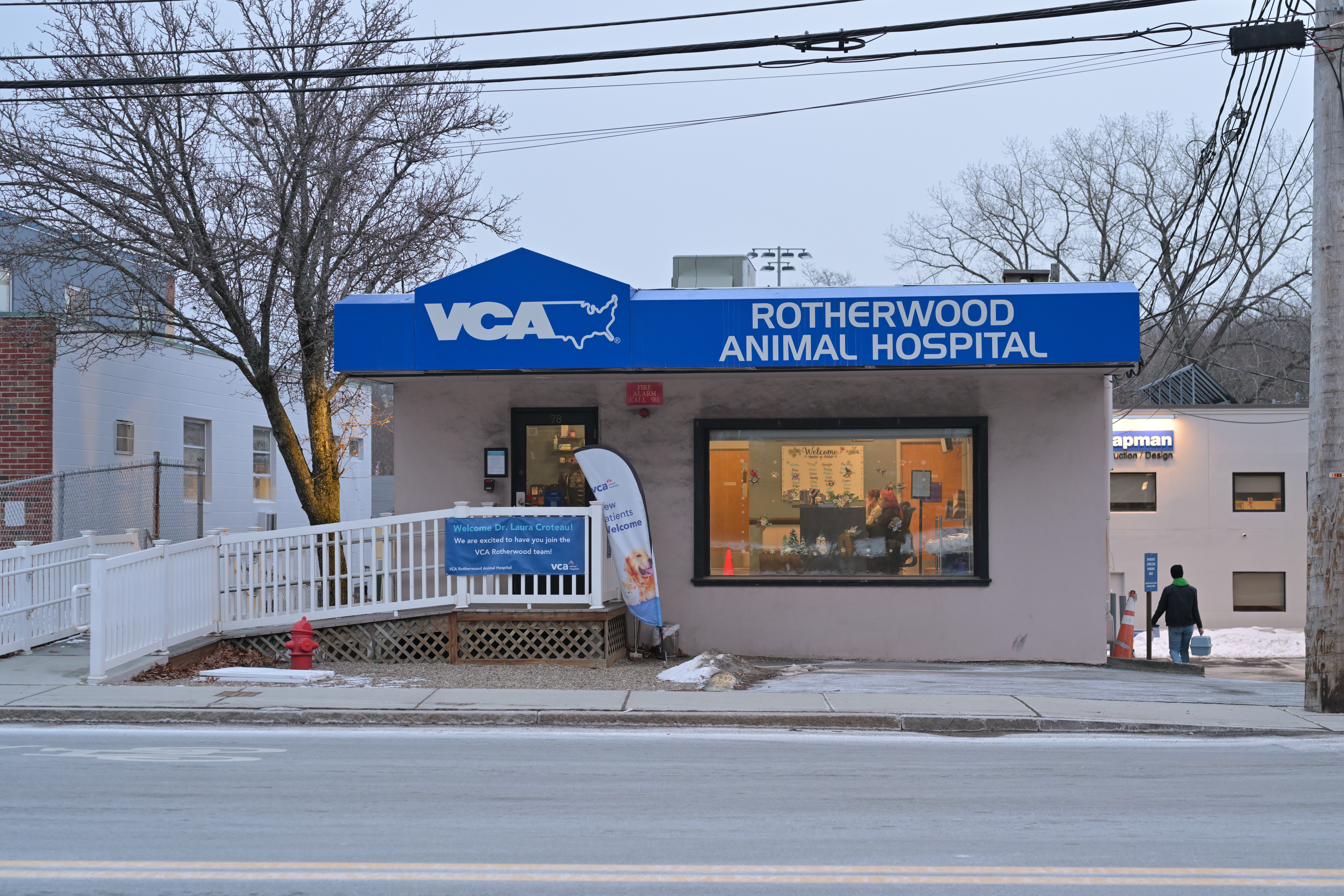
- A VCA animal hospital in Newton, Massachusetts
- Trade name: VCA Animal Hospitals
- Type: Subsidiary
- Founded: 1986; 40 years ago
- Founders: Neil Tauber; Robert Antin; Arthur Antin
- Headquarters: Los Angeles, California, United States
- Number of locations: 1000+ animal hospitals (2020)
- Areas served: United States and Canada
- Revenue: US$2.1 billion (2015)
- Number of employees: 27,100 (2018)
- Parent: Mars Petcare
- Subsidiaries: Sound/Antech Imaging Services; Camp Bow Wow
- Website: vcahospitals.com

VCA, Inc., doing business as VCA Animal Hospitals, operates more than 1,000 animal hospitals in the US and Canada. The company is based in Los Angeles, and was founded in 1986. Until its acquisition by Mars Inc. in 2017, VCA traded on the NASDAQ under the ticker "WOOF", which is now used by Petco.

VCA was founded in 1986 by three health care company executives, Neil Tauber and brothers Robert and Arthur Antin. The name is an abbreviation of Veterinary Centers of America, though VCA no longer uses this full name. VCA acquired its first veterinary clinic, West Los Angeles Veterinary Hospital, in 1987.

In October 2004, VCA purchased Sound Technologies, a company which supplied digital radiology and ultrasound equipment to veterinary hospitals. In July 2009, VCA purchased diagnostic imaging company Eklin Medical Systems, which was combined with Sound Technologies to form Sound/Antech Imaging Services.

In 2014, VCA acquired the dog day care center Camp Bow Wow, which had about 140 franchises in the US and one in Canada; and licensed the Barkley Pet Hotel & Day Spa brand in Westlake Village, California, from Beverly Hills Pet Hotels, Inc.

On January 9, 2017, Mars Inc. announced its intention to purchase VCA for $9.1 billion, operating it as an independent unit within the Mars Petcare division. VCA CEO Bob Antin remained in his position.
