= Balisto =

Dietary Fibred Wholemeal Biscuit

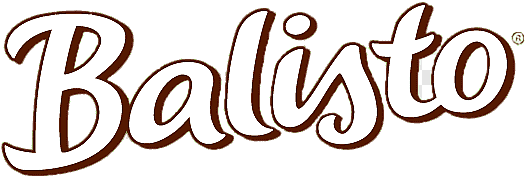

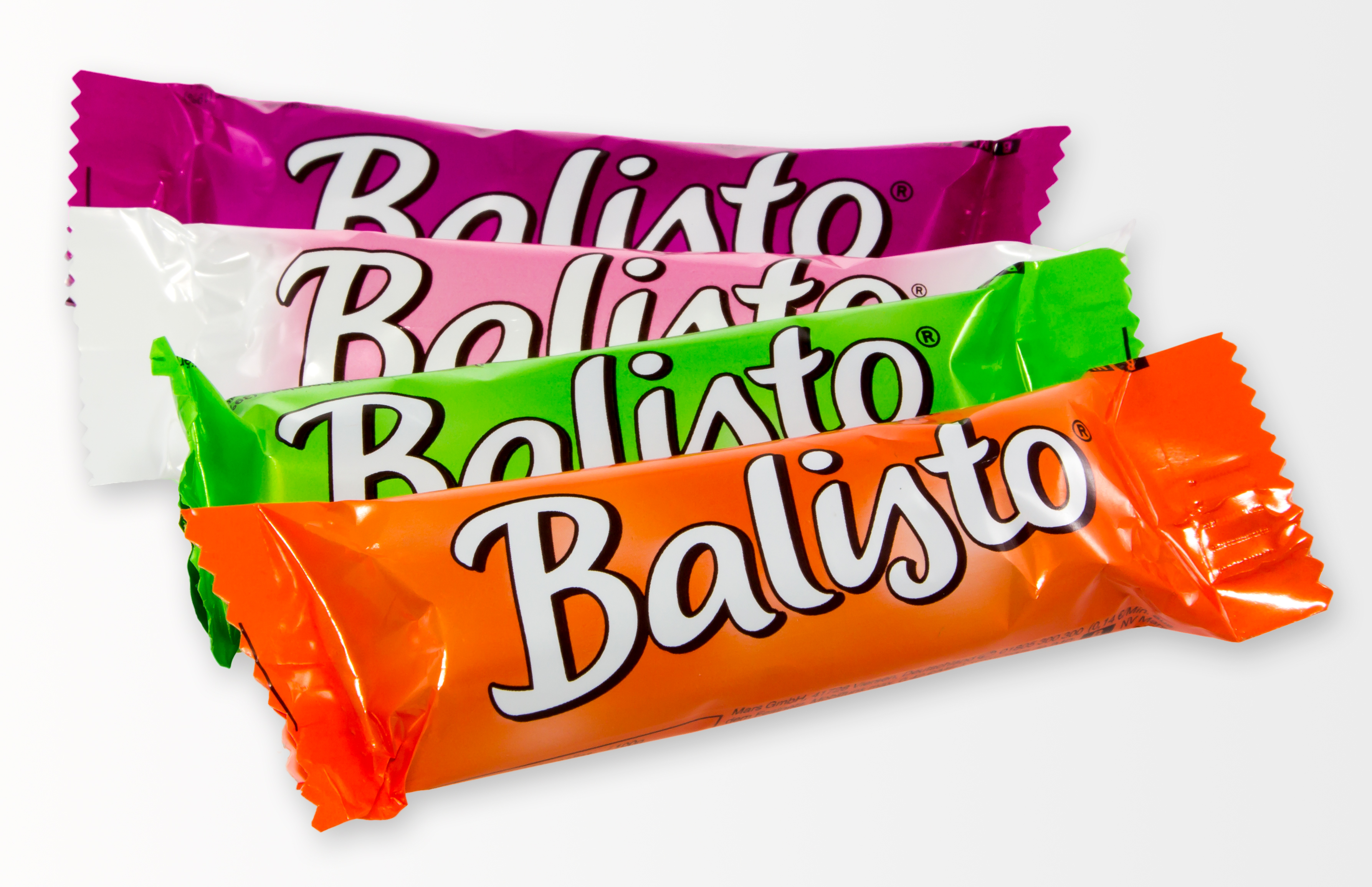
- Four different flavors of Balisto
- Product type: Chocolate
- Current owner: Mars, Incorporated
- Produced by: Mars, Incorporated
- Country: West Germany
- Introduced: 1981; 45 years ago

Balisto is German brand of wholemeal biscuit bar snacks manufactured by Mars, Incorporated, consisting of a digestive biscuit center and a variety of milky cream toppings, and coated in milk chocolate.

Normally, there are two fingers in a package, though the multipack contains ten fingers wrapped individually. They are available in Austria, Germany, Switzerland, the Netherlands, France, Luxembourg, Belgium, Slovenia, Hungary, Italy, Denmark. In Spring 2011, the bars were introduced to the United Kingdom.

When the Balisto bar was released in 1981, Mars, Incorporated in West Germany produced it. Its name supposedly alludes to its dietary fibre content ("Ballaststoffe" in German). In 2021, the Balisto bar with 90% paper-based packaging was released for the German market.

== Varieties ==
Balisto is available in several different flavours, each with their own colour. Not all flavours are available everywhere. A partial list:

- Corn/Cereal-mix (orange wrapper): plain digestive biscuit covered with chocolate
- Muesli-mix (green wrapper): milk cream topping with raisins and hazelnuts
- Grain-mix (red wrapper)
- Yoghurt and berries-mix (purple wrapper): yoghurt cream topping with red berries
- Almond and honey-mix (yellow wrapper)
- Cocos-mix (brown wrapper)
- Hazelnut (blue wrapper)
- Spekulatius-Christmas cookie (dark red wrapper)
- Strawberry yoghurt-mix (red wrapper) (available in Germany)
- Yoghurt with white chocolate (white and pink wrapper) (Limited Edition)
- Yoghurt with strawberry and white chocolate (white and red wrapper) (available in Germany)
