= CocoaVia =

Supplement brand name

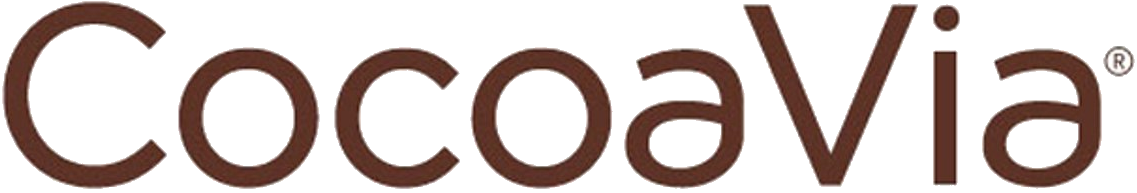
- Product type: Dietary supplement
- Current owner: Mars Inc.
- Country: United States
- Introduced: 2003; 23 years ago
- Website: cocoavia.com

CocoaVia is a brand name for a daily cocoa extract supplement. The name CocoaVia is a registered trademark of Mars Inc.

== Brand history ==
In 2003, the CocoaVia brand was first launched by Mars Chocolate. It was the first functional food launched by Mars, Incorporated. CocoaVia featured a line of dark chocolate bars and chews that contained cocoa flavanols and plant sterols. After the initial launch, the brand expanded its product line, introducing a range of products including milk chocolate, granola bars, chocolate covered almonds, and ready to drink beverages.

In 2009, Mars Chocolate discontinued the original line of CocoaVia. Also in 2009, Mars Botanical launched CirkuHealth, a cocoa extract-based dietary supplement. This was the first supplement launched by Mars, Incorporated and it featured cocoa extract that delivered cocoa flavanols.

In 2010, Mars Botanical launched two new products - CocoaVia and Cirku. Both were powdered cocoa extract supplements. CocoaVia came in sweetened and unsweetened dark chocolate flavors. These products had originally been launched under the brand CirkuHealth but were rebranded as CocoaVia. The Cirku brand offered a line of fruit flavored cocoa extract supplements and came in four varieties.

In 2012, the CocoaVia package graphics were redesigned. As part of the package graphics change, the Cirku flavored cocoa extract supplements were rebranded under the CocoaVia brand name.

The U.S. CocoaVia website is used to sell CocoaVia supplements.

== Product ==
CocoaVia is a daily cocoa extract supplement that contains 450 milligrams of cocoa flavanols per serving. Flavanols are naturally occurring phytonutrients. Scientists have identified a unique mixture of flavanols present in cocoa.

== Cocoa flavanols and Cocoapro ==
Although all chocolate is made from cocoa beans, a natural source of cocoa flavanols, not all chocolate or cocoa-based products contain cocoa flavanols because most traditional cocoa handling and processing procedures can destroy them.

As a result, percent of cocoa (cacao) is not a reliable indicator of the level of cocoa flavanols. Gentle handling and processing of the cocoa bean, from harvesting the bean through delivery of the product, are critical in preserving cocoa flavanols.
