= Foodspring =

German nutrition startup

- Company type: Startup
- Industry: Nutrition
- Founded: 2013; 13 years ago
- Founder: Tobias Schüle, Philipp Schrempp, ECONA AG
- Key people: Christian Bubenheim (CEO)
- Products: Sports nutrition (protein powder, protein bars, fitness foods)
- Owner: Mars, Incorporated
- Number of employees: 180 (as of 2024)
- Parent: Mars, Incorporated
- Website: foodspring.de

Foodspring is a German startup founded in 2013, which primarily sells sports nutrition such as protein powder and protein bars, but also 'fitness versions' of common foods. It was sold to Mars Inc. in 2019. All customer-facing operations will end by June 30, 2025.

== History ==
In 2013, Tobias Schüle and Philipp Schrempp founded the company in Berlin together with the ECONA AG.

It was purchased by Mars Inc. in 2019 for approximately 300 million euro through its investment arm Mars Edge. At the time, it had 130 employees. At the time, it was planned that the founders Schrempp and Schüle would remain in their respective positions at the company.

In 2021, the founders left the company, and were replaced by Gerrit Meier. As of 2024, the company has 180 employees.

In 2023, Christian Bubenheim was named as the new chief executive officer.

On March 04 2025, due to challenging market conditions, the company declared it took the decision to end all customer-facing operations by June 30, 2025.

== Products and reception ==
The company sells protein powder and shakes, as well as Protein bars, porridge, pancake mix and other food marketed as functional sports nutrition. The products are sold in 17 different countries.

Their products have been ranked favourably in product reviews, including by GQ Germany and Vogue Germany.

In 2020, a bread mix was recalled due to contamination with Ethylene oxide.
