= Pacers (confectionery) =

Confectionery brand (discontinued)

- Product type: Mint
- Current owner: Mars, Inc.
- Country: United Kingdom
- Introduced: ? (as "Pacers" in 1976)
- Discontinued: 1985; 41 years ago

Pacers is a discontinued British brand of mint flavoured confection, manufactured by Mars.

Originally known as "Opal Mints", they were plain white coloured chewy spearmint flavoured sweets, launched as a sister product to Opal Fruits (now known as Starburst). The product was subsequently relaunched as Pacers around 1976, and later, three green peppermint stripes were added to the sweet, possibly to align it with a similar American product of the same name. Television commercials for the sweet alluded to sport and fitness, with participants wearing green and white-striped kit, featuring the slogan "Peppermint striped for two-mint freshness". The brand was discontinued in 1985.

At one point the Glasgow Celtic football team were nicknamed "The Pacers" because of the similarity of their kit to the sweets.
