= Munch (candy bar) =

American candy bar

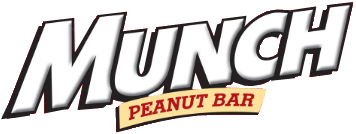

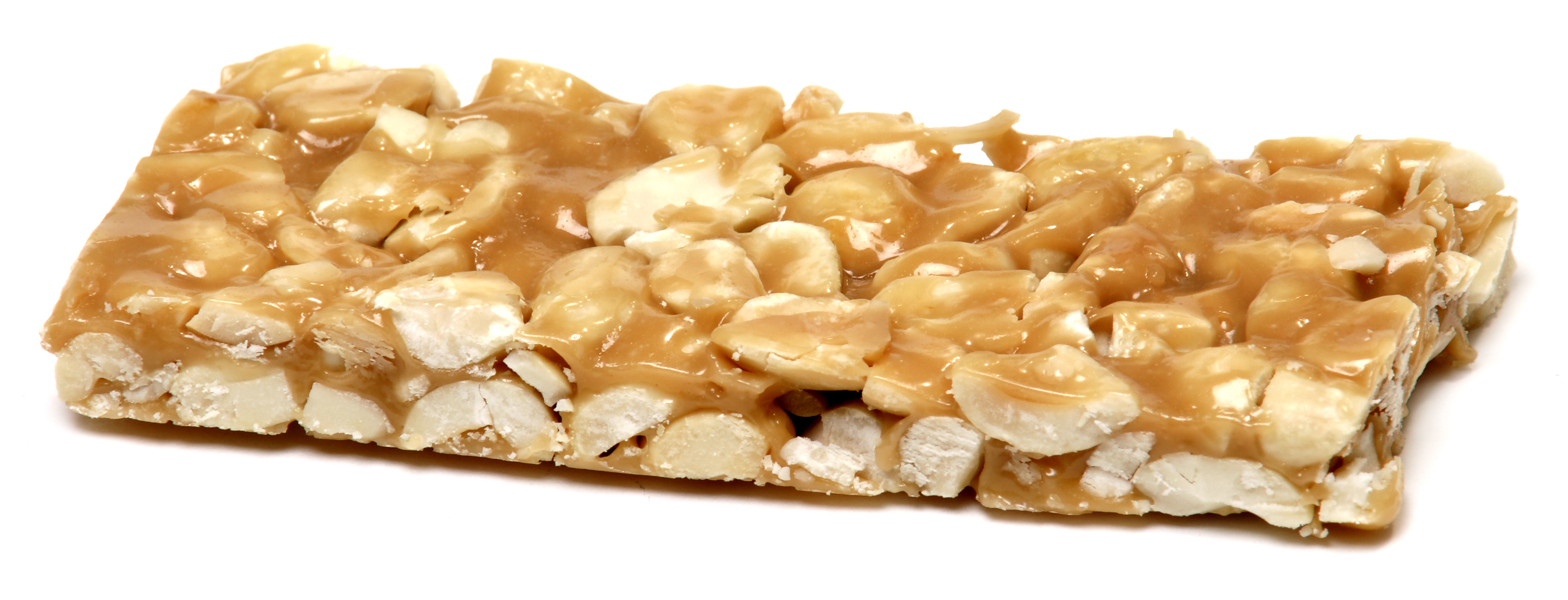
- A Munch bar
- Product type: Mars, Inc.
- Current owner: Mars, Inc.
- Introduced: 1970; 56 years ago
- Website: mars.com/munch-bar

Munch is a peanut candy bar manufactured by Mars, Incorporated and sold in the United States. The bar was introduced in 1970 as the "Snickers Munch Peanut Brittle Bar" and was later relabeled "Munch". It is made of only seven ingredients: peanuts, sugar, butter, corn syrup, palm oil, salt and soy lecithin.

The Munch bar is comparable to peanut brittle, but has a higher density of peanuts compared to most brittles.

Due to its short list of simple ingredients, it is marketed as being healthy and natural.
