= M-Azing =

Candy bar

- Wrapper of an M-Azing bar.
- Product type: Candy
- Current owner: Mars, Incorporated
- Country: United States
- Introduced: December 15, 2004; 21 years ago (first run); 2018; 8 years ago (second run, United States)
- Discontinued: 2015; 11 years ago (first run); 2021; 5 years ago (second run, United States)

M&M'S Chocolate Bar (formerly known as M-Azing) is a candy bar manufactured by Mars, Incorporated. It is a milk chocolate candy bar with M&M's Minis inside. It has been available in crunchy and peanut butter flavors, in singles and miniatures varieties.

== History ==
The product was originally introduced in Singles and Funsize formats in 2004. The bar was featured in The Apprentice, Season 2 Episode 13, Sweet and Lowdown, which aired on December 2, 2004. In 2005, a Minis format was launched. In 2006, the company discontinued all but the Crunchy Singles variety of the candy bar, and now has a "Now with better taste" sticker on it. Mars, Incorporated stated that they planned to rebrand the bar in 2008, but this did not happen.

In 2013, M-Azing was relaunched under the name M&M'S Chocolate Bar, which was discontinued in 2015. It was relaunched in late 2018 and was sold in the United States until 2021. The M&M'S Chocolate Bar remains available in the United Kingdom and other countries.

== See also ==
- List of chocolate bar brands
