= The Goodlife Recipe =

Brand of pet food

- Company type: Private
- Industry: Pet food
- Founded: McLean, Virginia, USA (1911)
- Headquarters: McLean, Virginia, United States
- Area served: United States, Canada
- Products: Dog food, cat food
- Owner: Mars, Incorporated
- Website: www.goodliferecipe.com

The Goodlife Recipe was a brand name of cat food manufactured in the United States by Mars, Incorporated. The brand debuted in 2007 with cat food and dog food, however, their dog food and dog treat lines were discontinued in August 2010 for economic reasons and cat food in June/July 2018.

== Packaging ==
The product's multiwall paper bag incorporating a slider zipper won an AmeriStar award from the Institute of Packaging Professionals.

== Promotion ==
As part of a promotional campaign, Jewel recorded a cover version of "The Good Life", a 1960s song popularized by Tony Bennett and Frank Sinatra.
