= BluePearl Specialty and Emergency Pet Hospital =

American pet hospital network

- Type: Subsidiary of Mars, Incorporated
- Industry: Veterinary Services
- Founded: 1996, Tampa, Florida
- Headquarters: Tampa, Florida, United States; 28.035474°N 82.492135°W
- Key people: Nicholas Nelson, DVM, MBA (President)
- Products: Veterinary care
- Number of employees: 7,000+ (2022)
- Website: bluepearlvet.com

BluePearl Specialty and Emergency Pet Hospital is a company owned by Mars, Incorporated that operates specialty and emergency veterinary hospitals throughout the United States. They currently have hospitals in 29 states, as of early 2022. The firm is one of the largest private providers of approved veterinary residency and internship educational programs in the world, and employs 1,330+ veterinarians, 1,600+ veterinary technicians, and 4,100+ other professionals.

== History ==
The firm was founded as Florida Veterinary Specialists in 1996 by two brothers, Dr. Neil Shaw, a board-certified specialist in veterinary internal medicine, and Darryl Shaw, a certified public accountant. In 2008, it merged with NYC Veterinary Specialists and Cancer Treatment Center in New York City and Veterinary Specialty and Emergency Center in Kansas City, creating BluePearl Specialty and Emergency Pet Hospital. In 2010, Georgia Veterinary Specialists and Michigan Veterinary Specialists also merged with the firm.

In October 2015, BluePearl Specialty and Emergency Pet Hospital was acquired by Mars Petcare division. This acquisition resulted in Mars Petcare, who also owns Banfield Pet hospital and pet food brands such as Royal Canin and Pedigree, becoming the largest pet nutrition and veterinary care provider in the world.

== Significant events ==
In February 2010, Dr. Helga Bleyaert, a specialist in veterinary neurology with BluePearl, assisted in giving a live shark from the Florida Aquarium an MRI after the shark had failed to eat anything and it seemed like there was a foreign object lodged in the shark's esophagus. This is one of the first times a live shark had ever been given an MRI under anesthesia.

In March 2013, the firm's Dr. Amy Zalcman, in Manhattan, oversaw the removal of 111 pennies from a Jack Russell Terrier named Jack. using the non-invasive Endoscopic foreign body retrieval, to remove the pennies one-by-one.

On May 22, 2013, the firm's Dr. Mike Reems removed a 4-pound hairball from a tiger in Clearwater, Fla. The hairball was given to Ripley's Believe it or Not.

On October 21, 2013, doctors from the firm saved the life of Eddie, a 5-year-old Belgian Shepherd Dog (Malinois) assigned to the U.S. Air Force's 6th Security Forces Squadron at MacDill Air Force Base when he presented at BluePearl Veterinary Partners in Tampa, Fla. with signs related to heatstroke. The dog, an Air Force K-9 trained to detect improvised explosive devices, is credited with saving the lives of several service members in Afghanistan when he detected an IED.

In 2017, an Instagram celebrity dog named Chloe died while in the care of Blue Pearl's New York hospital. Her death was attributed to a medical error and made headlines across the country.

Blue Pearl has been fined by the government for workplace safety violations in Washington state. They have also been fined for violating the Family and Medical Leave Act in Virginia.

== Partnerships ==
In 2011, the firm partnered with the U.S. Army to provide Army veterinarians and technicians preparing to deploy to areas of conflict with hands-on emergency veterinary experiences at the firm's hospitals. The program is a nine-day schedule where the soldiers experience first-hand medical veterinary emergencies.

== Awards and recognition ==
In 2009, Dr. Neil Shaw was featured in People as a hometown hero in the issue titled, "Hero in Hard Times."

In 2010, Darryl Shaw, CEO and Neil Shaw, Chief Medical Officer, received the Ernst & Young Florida Entrepreneur of the Year Award for the services category.

In August 2012, BluePearl Veterinary Partners was 1,695 on the 2012 Inc. 5000, a list of the 5,000 fastest growing businesses in the U.S. according to Inc. (magazine). BluePearl was also recognized as the 16th fastest growing company in Tampa for 2012 by Inc. (magazine).

In December 2012, BluePearl Veterinary Partners was ranked #36 out of the top 100 job creators in the U.S. according to Inc. Magazine's Hire Power Awards.
