= Flyte (chocolate bar) =

Chocolate bar manufactured by Mars

Flyte was a chocolate bar manufactured by Mars, Incorporated weighing 45 grams. The product was introduced in 1996.

Each bar came wrapped in two individual halves. It consisted of a chocolatey, whipped nougat-style centre coated in milk chocolate. It was essentially the same as a UK Milky Way bar before the filling in Milky Way bars was changed from chocolate to vanilla flavour in 1993.

The bar was discontinued in 2015.

== Nutritional information ==
Nutrition	per 100 g	per 22.5 g (half a bar)
Energy	1818 kJ (432 kcal)	409 kJ (97 kcal)
Protein	3.6 g	0.8 g
Carbohydrate	74.3 g	16.7 g
Fat	13.3 g	3.0 g
