= Dolmio =

Pasta sauces

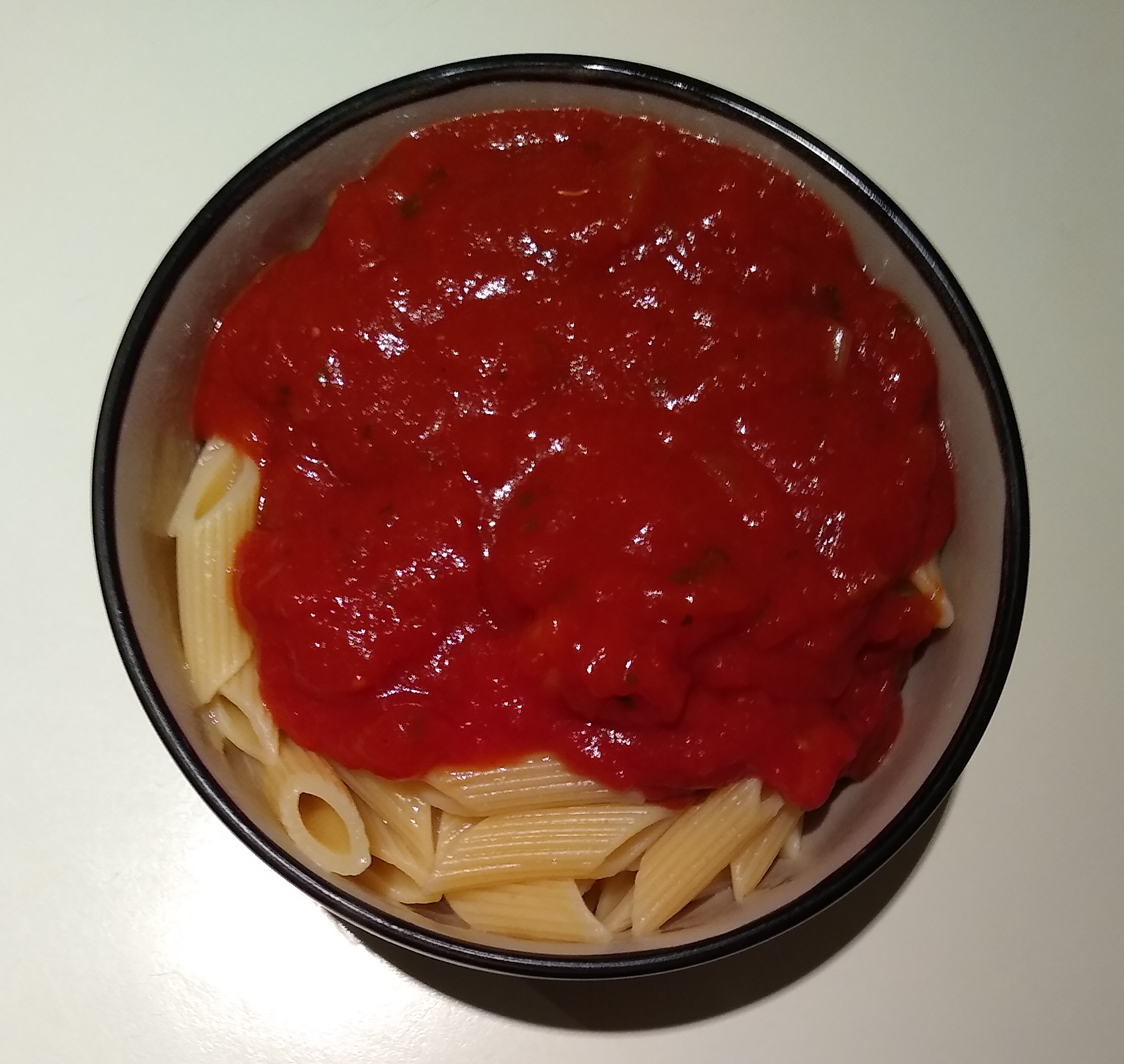
- Dolmio sauce on pasta
- Product type: Pasta sauce
- Current owner: Mars, Inc.
- Country: Australia
- Introduced: 1985; 41 years ago
- Markets: North America, Western Europe, Australia, New Zealand, Russia
- Website: dolmio.com.au

Dolmio is the brand name of a range of pasta sauces made by Mars, Incorporated. The range includes jars of sauces and ready-meal style packets and stir-ins. The company is marketed in television commercials and other media by puppets, known as "The Dolmio Family", who also feature on the packaging, The Dolmio Family were introduced in Australia and New Zealand in 1987 and were portrayed by actors before being re-introduced as puppets in 2003.

== History ==
Dolmio pasta sauce in Australia was originally named "Alora" by Anna Ciccone and marketed by Masterfoods (and Mars), starting with a test launch of Alora Spaghetti Bolognese sauce in a 500g resealable glass jar 1985. The same year, Alora began a small test launch in the Grampians region of Scotland. Following its success, Alora was renamed Dolmio and rolled out across the UK in 1986, and subsequently renamed Dolmio globally in 1989.

It was a sponsor of Britain's mid-morning magazine show This Morning from 2005 to 2010.

In 2016, the company took the unprecedented step of advising that some of its products should only be eaten once a week, due to high levels of salt, sugar and fat.

Dolmio products are also available in the Nordic countries, Republic of Ireland, New Zealand and Russia.
