= Ouch! (gum) =

Type of sugar-free bubble gum

- Product type: Bubble gum
- Current owner: Mars, Inc.
- Produced by: Wrigley Company
- Introduced: 1990s; 35 years ago

Ouch! is a sugar-free bubble gum made by the Wm. Wrigley Jr. Company under the Hubba Bubba brand name. By the 1990s, the gum was available in the flavors of grape, watermelon, and strawberry. Each stick of gum was wrapped with paper made to look like a bandage and was packaged in a metallic container similar to that of a bandage box. It also comes in multiple colours.

In October 2009, the gum was redesigned to have a new look and packaging, and is now also available in bubblegum flavor. Each pack comes with one of a possible twenty collectable games inside.
