= Lockets =

Confectionery product

Lockets are a confectionery produced by the Wrigley Company in the UK and Czech Republic. They are sold as medicated supplement to help nasal congestion and sore throats.

== Flavours ==
They are available in multiple flavours including cranberry and blueberry, menthol and honey. A blackcurrant flavour was produced, but was discontinued in 2009.

== About ==
Lockets contain menthol, eucalyptus, vitamin C and a centre with honey. Packets generally contain 10 medicated lozenges.

== Ingredients ==
- Sugar
- Glucose syrup
- Honey
- Glycerol
- Citric acid
- Vitamin C
- Monopropylene glycol
- Colors E122 and E142
