= Nutri-Grain =

Breakfast cereal brand

Nutri Grain
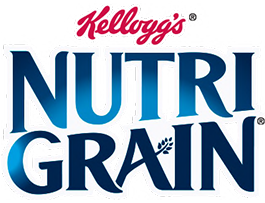

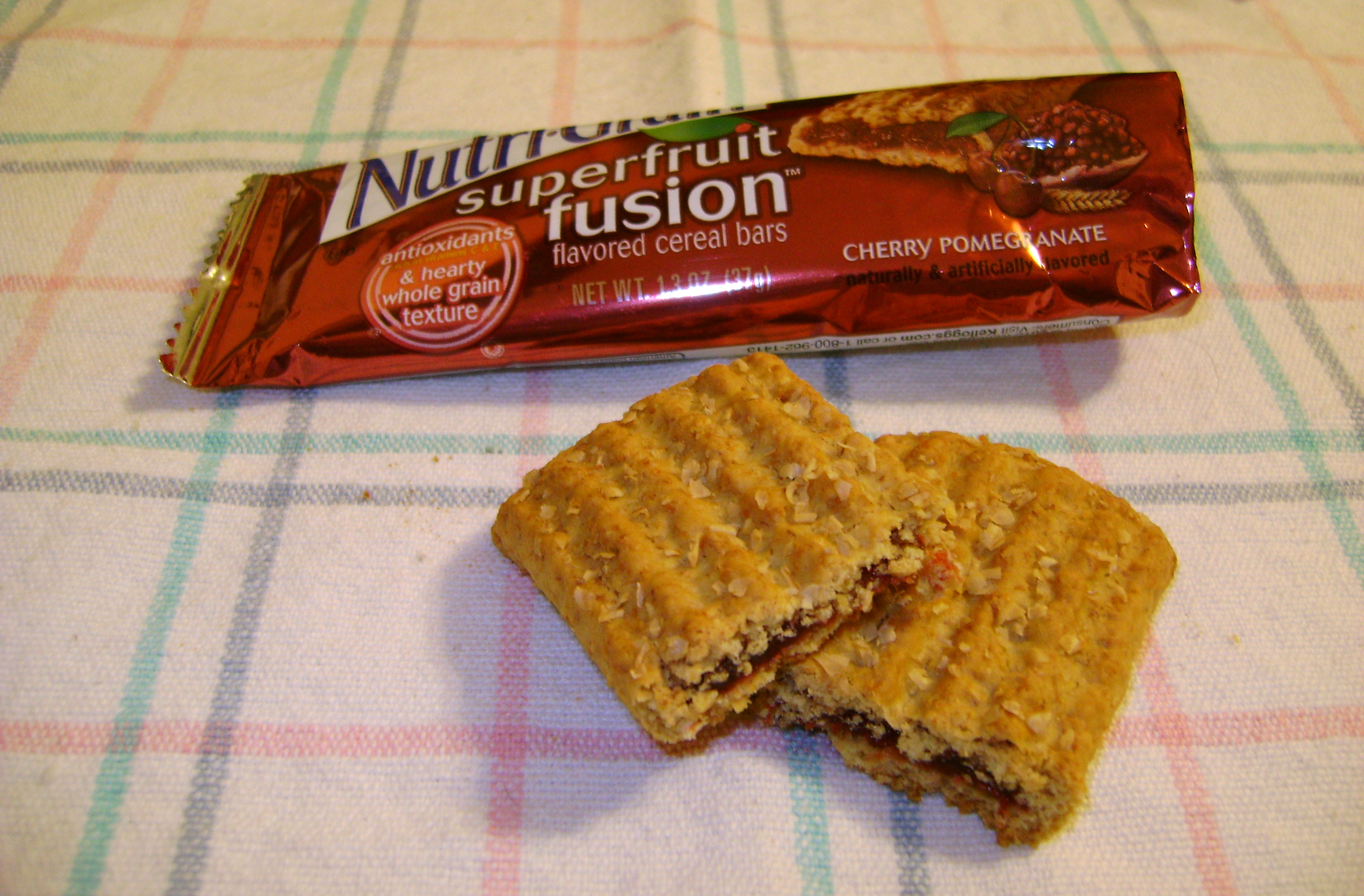
- Nutri-Grain cereal bar
- Product type: Breakfast cereal, cereal bar
- Current owner: Kellanova
- Country: Australia
- Introduced: 1976; 50 years ago
- Previous owners: Kellogg's (1976-2023)
- Website: kelloggs.com/nutrigrain

Nutri-Grain is a brand of breakfast cereal and breakfast bar made by Kellanova since 1976. In Australia and New Zealand Nutri-Grain is a breakfast cereal made from corn, oats, and wheat. The pieces are shaped like bricks.

In the United States, Canada, the United Kingdom and Ireland, the Nutri-Grain name is used for soft breakfast bars.

== History ==
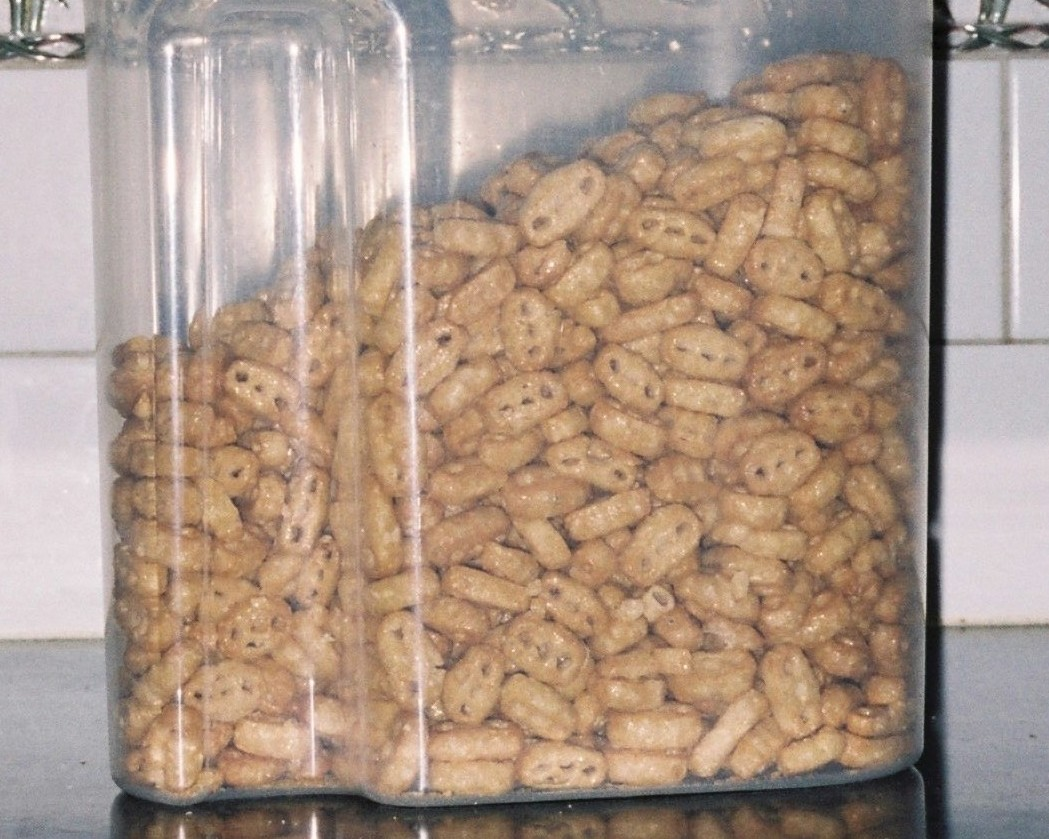
Nutri-Grain breakfast cereal sold in Australia and New Zealand

The breakfast cereal in its original "block and hole" shape was introduced in Australia in 1976, and later in 1981 consisting of flakes without added sugar. There were four varieties initially (rye, corn, barley, and wheat); later these were reduced to corn and wheat, and finally the corn line was completely discontinued. There are various Nutri-Grain Bars made from the breakfast cereal bonded together, available in the markets where the cereal is available. The bars became popular in the 1990s as an "on-the-go" food.

In 2013, Nutri-Grain breakfast drinks were added to the line of cereals for the Australian market.

== UK and Ireland products ==
In the UK, Nutri-Grain bars are around one-third cereals (mainly wheat-flour) and around ten percent fruit. Breakfast bars are a similar product to the muesli bar or granola bar.

=== Breakfast bars ===
- Apple
- Strawberry
- Blueberry

=== Breakfast Bakes range (formerly Elevenses) ===
- Raisin
- Ginger
- Golden Oat
- Chocolate Chip

=== Breakfast biscuits ===
- Cereal & Milk
- Oats & Honey
- Fruit & Fibre

== Canada products ==
=== Cereal bars ===
- Strawberry
- Raspberry
- Mixed Berry
- Blueberry
- Apple Cinnamon

=== Fruit crunch ===
- Apple Crisp
- Strawberry Parfait

=== Soft Bakes ===
- Mixed Berry
- apple cinnamon
- strawberry
- Blueberry
- strawberry and Greek yogurt
- Raspberry
- Chocolate Raspberry
- Pumpkin Spice (limited time)

== US products ==
=== Breakfast bars ===
- Cherry
- Raspberry
- Chocolate Raspberry
- Blackberry
- Apple Cinnamon
- Blueberry
- Mixed Berry
- Strawberry
- Strawberry Yogurt
- Cinnamon

== Australian and New Zealand products ==
=== Breakfast cereal ===
- Nutri-Grain Original
- Nutri-Grain EDGE Oat Clusters

=== Bars ===
- Nutri-Grain Original
- Nutri-Grain EDGE

== Health ==
Nutri-Grain received two stars out of five on the Australian Government's health star ratings.
