= Sugus =

Swiss candy brand

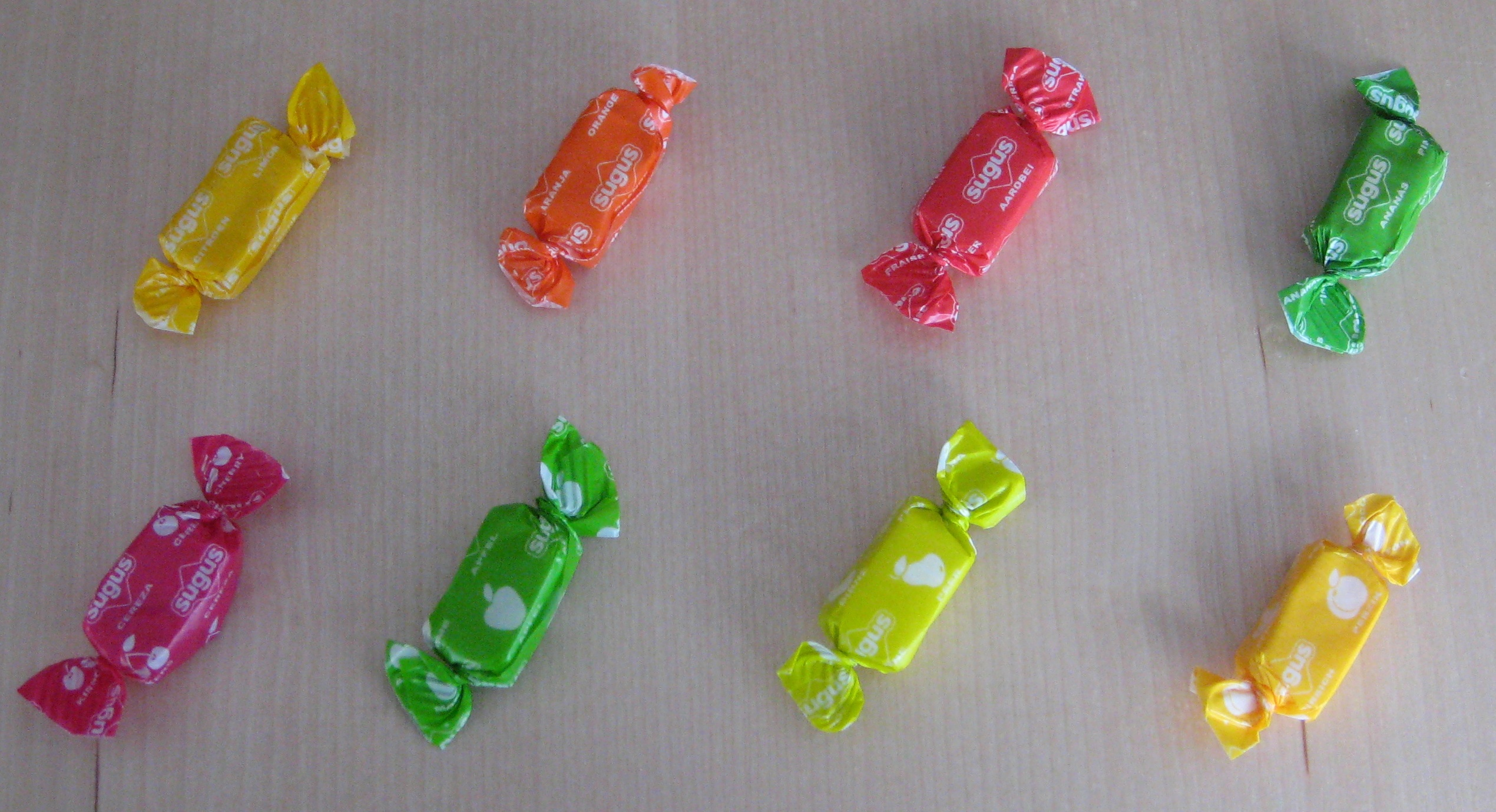
Lemon, orange, strawberry, pineapple, cherry, apple, pear and peach (from top left to bottom right)

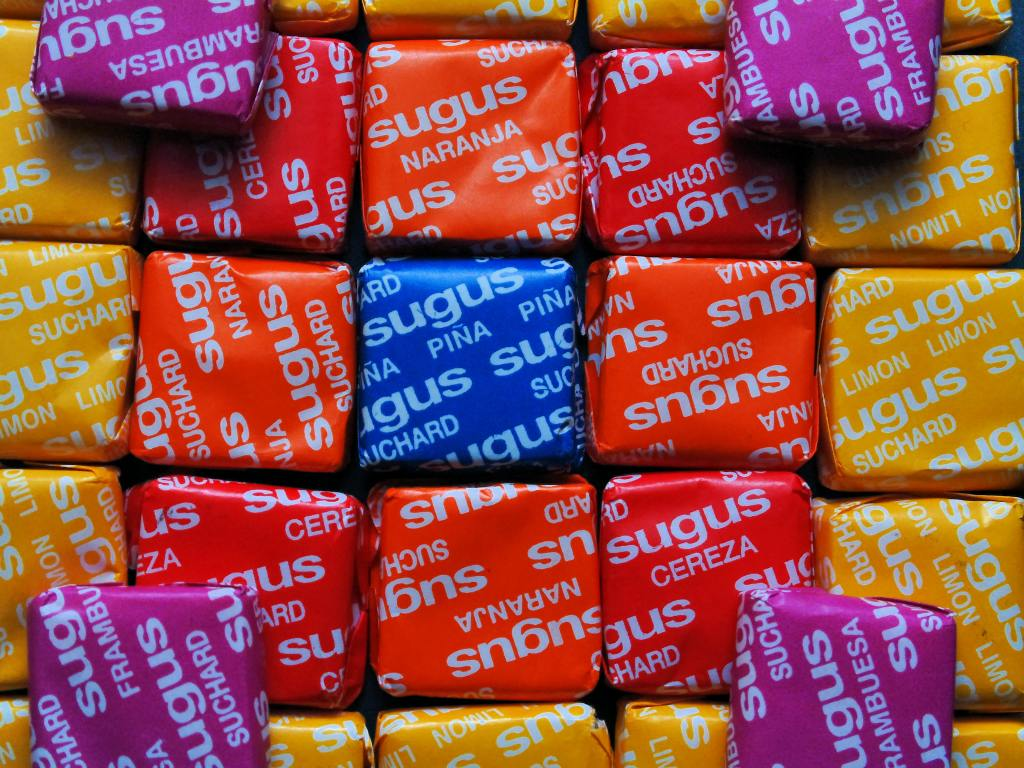
Square-shaped

Sugus is a brand of chewy candy manufactured by the Wrigley Company. It was created in 1931 by the Swiss chocolate company Suchard, which was later acquired by Kraft Foods in 1990. Wrigley acquired the candy business of Kraft Foods including the Sugus brand in 2004.

== Description ==
Sugus candies are square, and they are 20 mm (0.79 in) in length and width, and 7 mm (0.28 in) thick, including the packaging. There are several flavours, including lemon, orange, pineapple, raspberry and cherry, indicated by the colour of the packaging (yellow, orange, blue, red, and bright red, respectively), which is characteristic of the sweet. The classic packaging (which measured 6.3 by 4.5 cm) has rectangular sweets, with white text showing the Sugus name (in lowercase) and the specific flavor (in uppercase), all over the packaging. Within the packaging was a small, off-white inner wrapper of 6.3 by 1.9 cm surrounding the sweet preventing adhesion to the outer wrapper, for example at times of excessive heat.

== Availability ==
Sugus is sold in Argentina, Belgium, Brunei, Cambodia, China, Hong Kong, Indonesia, Japan, Macau, Malaysia, Mexico, Namibia, Philippines, Poland, Portugal, Romania, South Africa, Spain, Switzerland, Taiwan, Thailand, Uruguay and Vietnam. The brand's Chinese name used in Hong Kong and China is "瑞士糖", which directly translates to "Swiss candy".
