= William Wrigley III =

American businessman (1933–1999)

William A. Wrigley III
- Born: January 21, 1933; Chicago, Illinois, U.S.
- Died: March 8, 1999 (aged 66); Chicago, Illinois, U.S.
- Occupation: Confectionery magnate
- Spouses: Allison Hunter Wrigley Johnston (m. 1957; div. 1969); Joan Georgina Fischer (m. 1970; ann. 1979); Julie Burns (m. 1981)
- Children: 3, including William Jr. II
- Parents: Philip K. Wrigley (father); Helen Blanche Atwater (1901-1977) (mother)

William A. Wrigley III (January 21, 1933 – March 8, 1999), known as William Wrigley, was president of the Wm. Wrigley Jr. Company, founded by his grandfather William Wrigley Jr., from 1961 until his death from pneumonia in March 1999. His father, P. K. Wrigley, preceded him as president. He was succeeded by his son Bill Wrigley Jr. as president and CEO. He inherited ownership of the Chicago Cubs in 1977. Only a few months later, his mother died, saddling him with massive estate taxes. With most of his money tied up in the Wrigley Company and the Cubs, he eventually sold the Cubs to the Chicago Tribune in 1981 to pay off the tax bill.

After assuming the company's presidency in 1961, Wrigley maintained its position as the world's largest manufacturer of chewing gum by venturing into Orbit, Freedent, Extra, Hubba Bubba, and Big Red.

== Personal ==
Wrigley was a 1954 graduate of Yale College, where he was manager of the Yale football team.

He was first married in 1957 to Alison Hunter. They had three children, Alison Elizabeth, Philip Knight, and William Jr., before their marriage ended in divorce in 1969. The following year in a ceremony on Catalina island, he married Joan Georgine Fisher. That marriage ended in annulment. In November 1981, he married Julie Burns.

On March 9, 1999, William Wrigley died of pneumonia in Chicago.
