= Orbit (gum) =

Brand of chewing gum

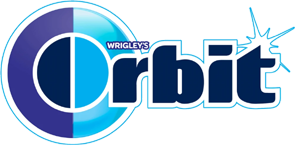
- Orbit logo as used in the US

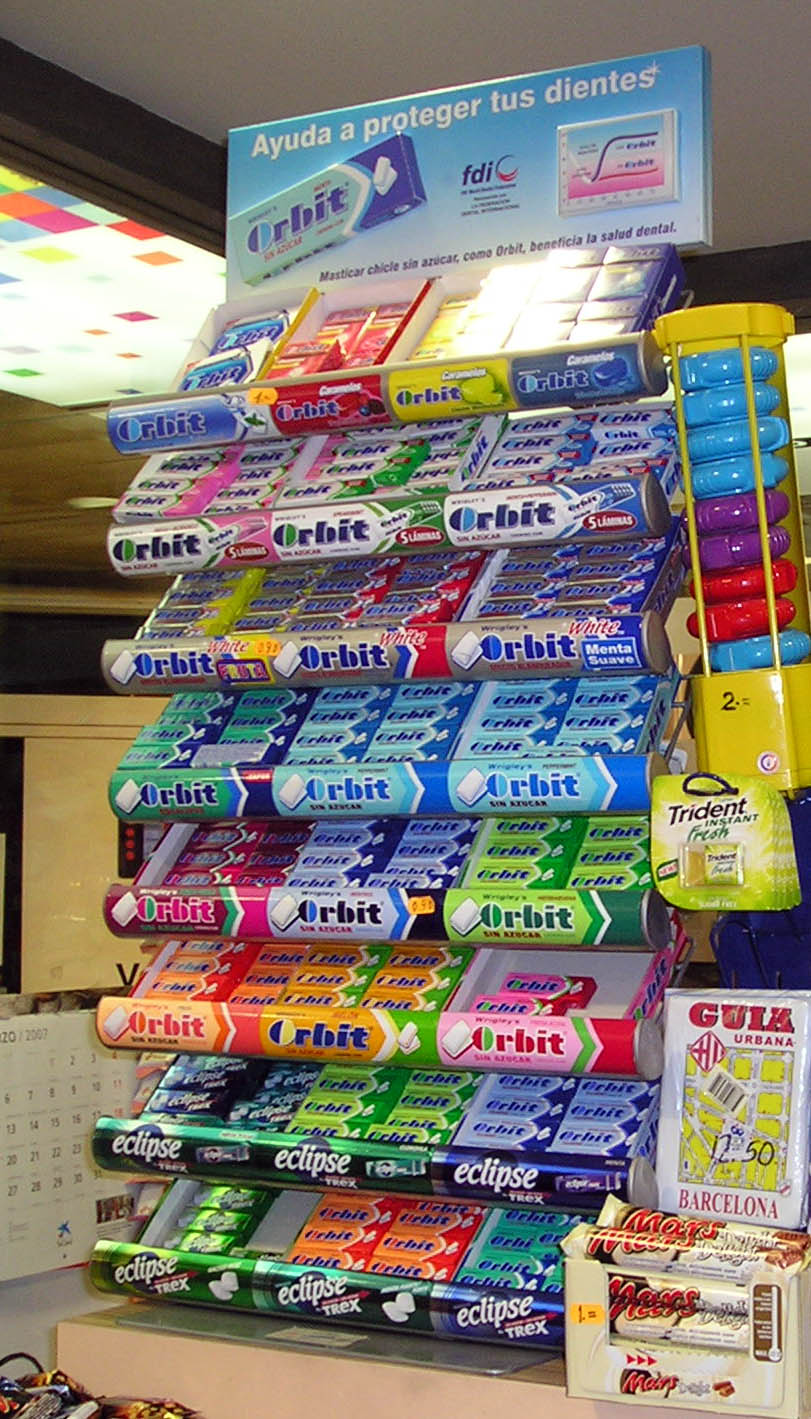
- Several Orbit gum flavors
- Product type: Chewing gum
- Current owner: Mars, Inc.
- Produced by: Wrigley Company
- Country: United States
- Introduced: ca. 1900s 1976; 50 years ago (current product)
- Related brands: Extra
- Website: orbitgum.com

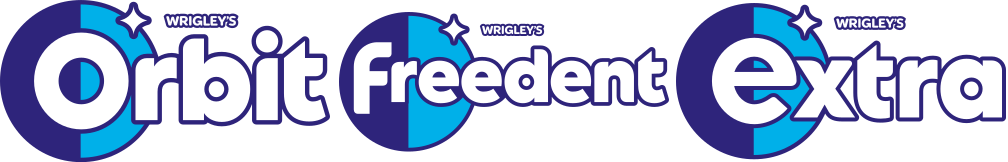
Orbit, Freedent, Extra logos (international)

Orbit, also sold in some markets as Extra, Freedent or Yida, is a brand of sugarless chewing gum from the Wrigley Company. In the United States, where it was re-launched in 2001, it is sold in cardboard boxes with 14 individually wrapped pieces per package.

== History ==
The Orbit name in chewing gums dates back to the early 20th century. It was made as Orbit Listerated Gum, by the Common Sense Co. (later known as Listerated Gum Corp.). The Orbit trademark went to Wrigley when it bought Listerated Gum Corp in 1925.

Wrigley marketed an Orbit gum in 1940s in the United States as a replacement brand by Wrigley due to rationing of gum-making ingredients in World War II. The brand was discontinued after the war ended, when Wrigley's three established gum brands, Juicy Fruit, Wrigley's Spearmint and Doublemint, returned to the US market.

The Orbit brand was reintroduced 30 years later in 1976, when it was introduced in Germany, Switzerland and The Netherlands. This marked the first time that a sugar-free gum was marketed under the Wrigley name. The brand was later introduced in many other countries around the world. In the US, Orbit launched in 1977 but ran into trouble because of its xylitol sweetener. In 1984, Wrigley launched Extra which contained the aspartame sweetener.

In Australia, Orbit was discontinued in 1989, two years after Extra launched.

The Orbit gum was relaunched in the US in 2001.

== Brand names ==
Different brand names have been used for the product in different markets. For example, the Orbit name is used in the US, Mexico, Spain and Poland, whereas the Extra name is used in Great Britain, Germany and Australia, Freedent is used in France and the Netherlands, and Yida is used in China.

The Orbit brand was retired completely in Britain and Ireland in 2015 in favor of Extra, with the same 14-piece package. In 2019 the replacement was applied in Germany as well. Both brands were in use before the complete change to Extra.

== Advertising ==
The US advertising campaign for Orbit centered on the Orbit Girl, a British accented character who always showed up to "dirty" and awkward situations wearing all white, a scarf, and a smile. Vanessa Branch played the Orbit Girl from 2001 to 2010, when she was replaced by Farris Patton, who played the Orbit Girl from 2010 through 2014.

In 2014, Orbit moved to a more global approach to marketing, replacing the Orbit Girl, and with a new commercial with Sarah Silverman to kick off its new campaign: "Eat. Drink. Chew Orbit." to emphasize the benefits of chewing gum after eating and drinking.

A British TV ad for Extra chewing gum, seen in September 2017, featured a young woman stood in a football kit on a football pitch whilst chewing, appearing to be preparing to take a penalty kick. A complaint to the ASA was upheld with the ad being described as 'dangerous'.

== Sub-brands ==
=== Orbit White ===
Orbit White was launched in 2002 as a sugar-free pellet gum and sub brand of Orbit gum. Packaged in blister packs of 12 pieces, it was released to compete with Cadbury Adams' Trident White gum in 2001.

=== Orbit for Kids ===
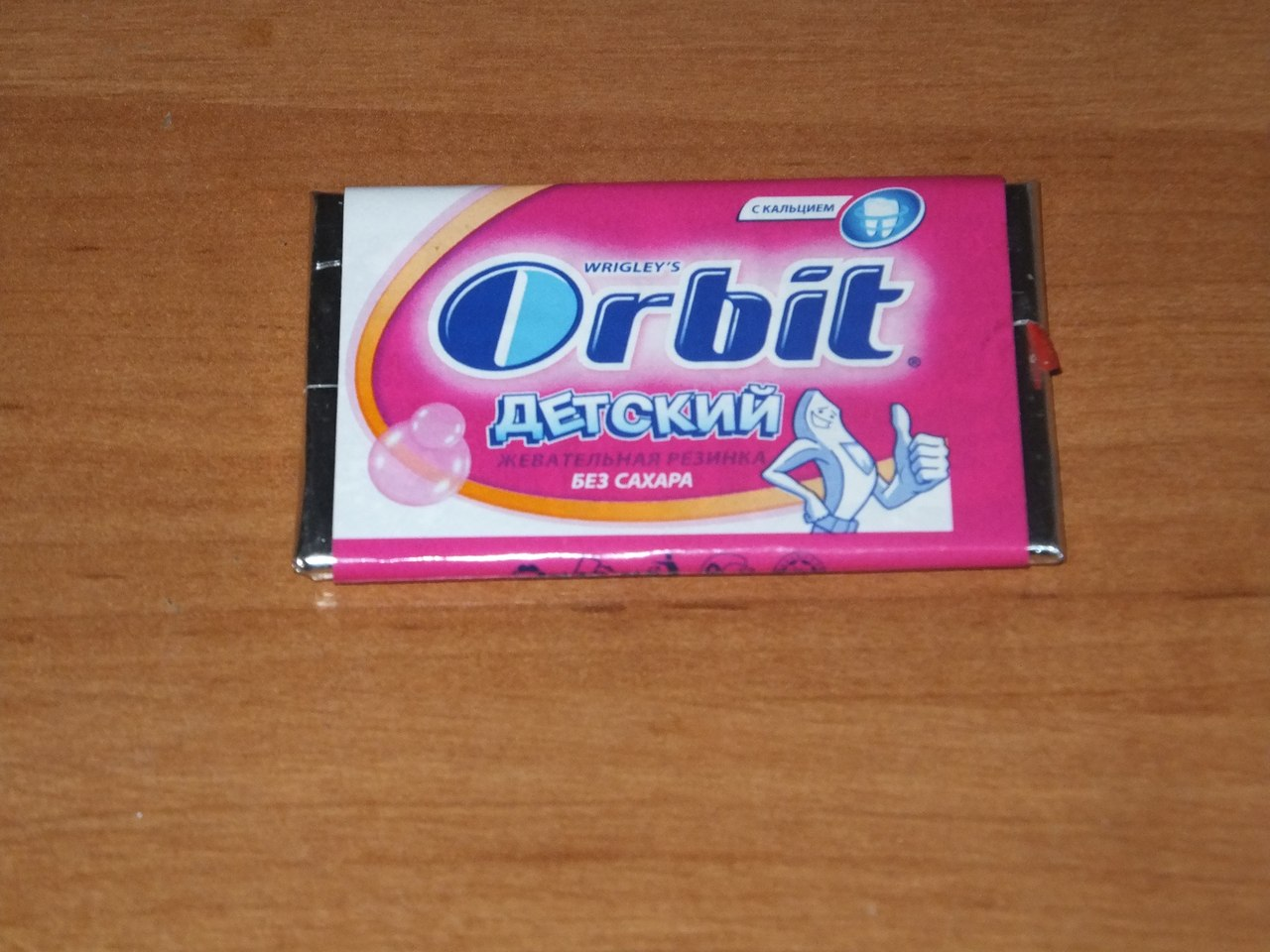
Orbit Kids pack

Orbit Kids is another sub brand aimed at children. Flavors include bubblegum, strawberry, banana, and grapes.

=== Orbit Mist ===
Orbit Mist (Excel Mist in Canada) was launched in about 2009. had "micro-bursts" which are small polka dot chips filled with a flavor contrast to the rest of the stick. The "micro-bursts" were meant to create "a hydrating sensation", as claimed on the box. Flavors were Peppermint Spray, Watermelon Spring, and Mango Surf. Orbit discontinued the Orbit Mist subline in 2013.

=== Orbit Refreshers ===
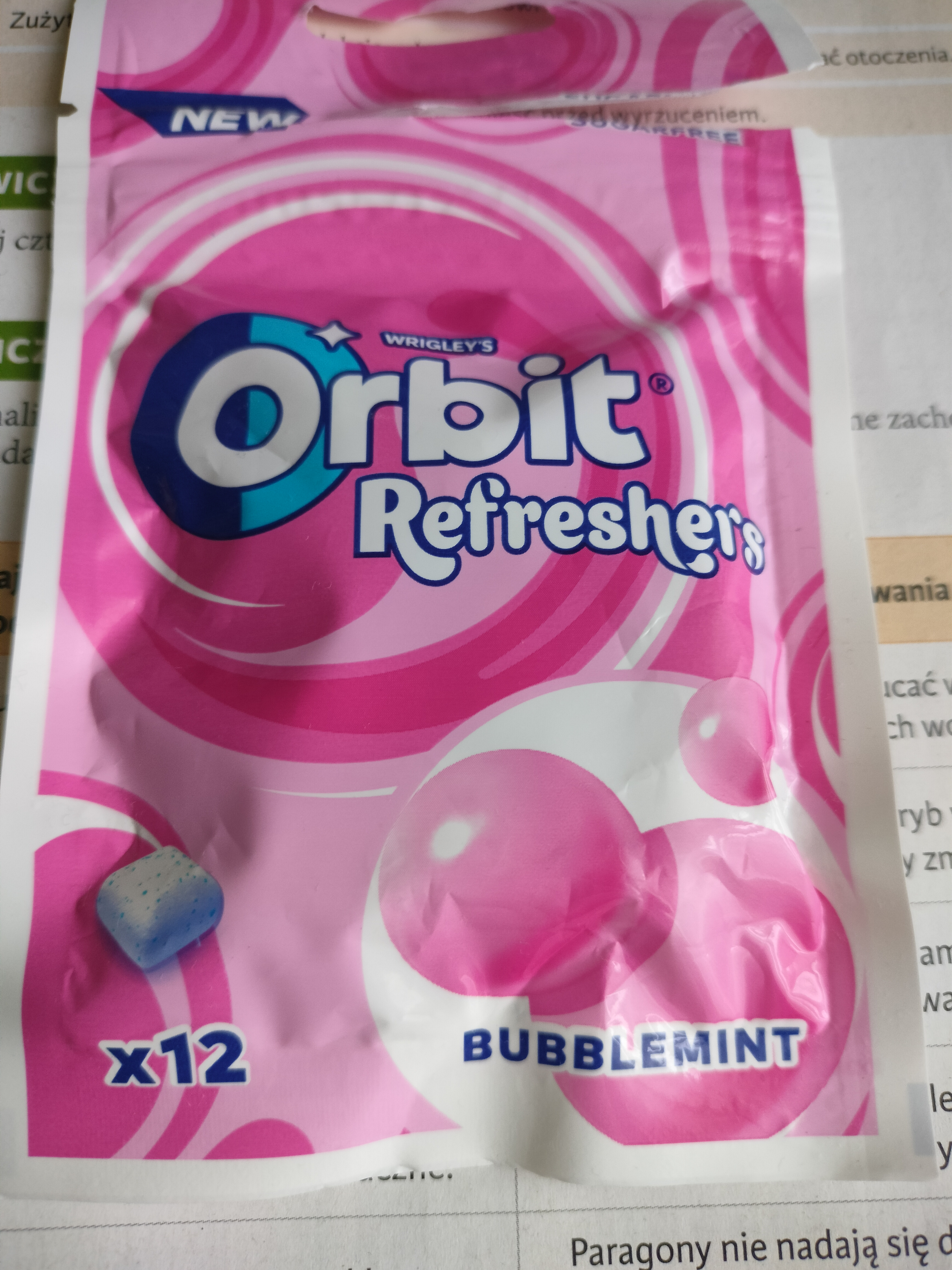
Orbit Refreshers in Bubblemint flavor

Orbit Refreshers (or Extra/Freedent Refreshers) is a more recent new product of the gum described as "soft cubes".

== Flavors ==
- Peppermint
- Bubblegum
- Spearmint
- Eucalyptus
- Mint
- Bubblemint
- Wintermint
- Winterfresh
- Sweetmint
- Freeze Mint
- Citrusmint
- Apple Remix
- Tropical Remix
- Strawberry Remix
- Wildberry Remix
- Peppermint DoublePak
- Spearmint DoublePak
- Citrus Remix
- Melon Remix
- Crystal Mint
- Lemon Lime
- Mint Mojito
- Maui Melon Mint
- Positively Pomegranate
- Raspberry Mint
- Fabulous Fruitini
- Sangria Fresca (discontinued)
- Strawberry Mint
- Lime Melon
- Piña Colada
- Orange Cardamom
- Mixed Fruit
- Coca-Cola
- Blueberry
- Raspberry Pomegranate
- Raw Mango
