= Winterfresh =

Brand of chewing gum

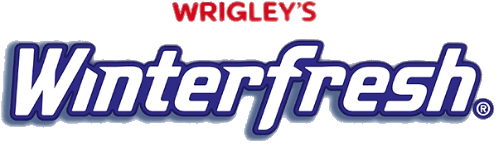
- Product type: Chewing gum
- Current owner: Mars, Inc.
- Produced by: Wrigley Company
- Country: United States
- Introduced: 1994; 32 years ago
- Website: marscom//winterfresh

Winterfresh is a wintergreen flavored variety of chewing gum made by the Wm. Wrigley Jr. Company. Introduced in the United States in 1994, it was the largest-selling sugar gum in the market by the end of the decade. It was marketed as an alternative to the Big Red brand. Extra gum, a sugarless gum, introduced a Winterfresh flavor in 1988, while Freedent introduced a Winterfresh flavor around the same time the Winterfresh brand gum was introduced.

Each three-gram stick contains 10 calories (42 kilojoules).

== Cool Breath Power commercials ==
From 2006 to 2008, Winterfresh aired a series commercials called "Cool Breath Power", as most of them were "Attraction Chronicles". These commercials were targeted at the teen demographic, and typically featured a narrator giving bizarre love advice in a bizarre world. Its director, illustrator, and animator was Karl Ackermann and Newgrounds animator LoveMaestro21, done in an old style of Macromedia Flash by Milky Elephant, with some people believing that the animation is very similar to early seasons of South Park.

Its creative directors were Bobby Pawar, Miles Turpin, and Sean Donohue, who also is the art director of the commercials.
