= Food Creatures =

Wrigley's Food Creatures are little cute characters that appear in Wrigley's Orbit, Extra, Freedent and Excel advertisements.

The advertising campaign started in 2007.

== List ==
Here is a list of all of the 24 Food Creatures :

- Doughnut
- Garlic
- Onion
- Coffee
- Cigarette
- Banana
- Pizza
- Cookie
- Soft Drink
- Pop-Corn
- Chocolate
- Raspberry
- Sushi
- Sandwich
- Chip Bag
- Wine
- Toast
- Tea
- Salsa
- Cereal Box
- Broccoli
- Chicken Leg
- Pepper
- Sausage
