= Bubble Tape =

Type of Hubba Bubba bubble gum

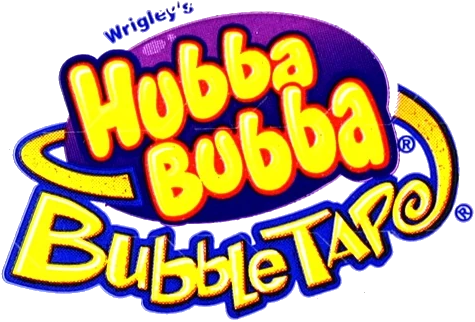
- Product type: Bubble gum
- Current owner: Mars, Inc.
- Produced by: Wrigley Company
- Introduced: 1988; 38 years ago
- Website: hubbabubba.com/tape

Bubble Tape is a type of Hubba Bubba bubble gum produced by Wrigley Company, and introduced in 1988. It experienced its greatest popularity in the early 1990s, due to its unique packaging and direct marketing to preteen children ("it's six feet of bubble gum — for you, not them"; "them" referring to parents or just adults in general). At the peak of its popularity, over 1 million containers for Bubble Tape were being manufactured a week.

Bubble Tape comes in a small, round, plastic container similar in size to a hockey puck. This contains six feet (1.8 m) of gum wrapped in a spiral. The container functions much like a tape dispenser, although the top half can be removed or broken off.

== Flavors ==
Most flavors are those available from the regular Hubba Bubba chewing gum line:

- Awesome Original
- Sour Green Apple
- Sour Watermelon
- Sour Blue Raspberry
- Cotton Candy
- Strapping Strawberry
- Juicy Fruit
- Gushing Grape
- Snappy Strawberry
- Triple Treat (also titled 'Triple Mix') – A mix of strawberry, blueberry, and watermelon
- Sugar Free Very Berry – A dentist-recommended version of Bubble Tape, a mix of grape and blue raspberry
- Candy Cane – A seasonal flavor
- Tangy Tropical
- Cola Party
- Groovy Watermelon

=== Also available in ===
- Mega Roll – 10 feet (3.0 m) of Bubble Tape gum
- King Size – 9 feet (2.7 m) of Bubble Tape gum
