= Alert (gum) =

Caffeine gum

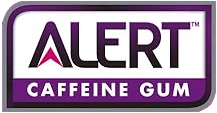
- Product type: Chewing gum
- Current owner: Mars, Inc.
- Produced by: Wrigley Company
- Introduced: 2013; 13 years ago
- Website: mars.com/alert-fruit

Alert is an energy caffeine gum produced by the Wrigley's company that entered the U.S. market in April 2013.

== Sales and marketing ==
Sales are aimed at adults 25 and older who want a portable energy product. An eight-piece pack of Alert retails for $2.99 (U.S.).

=== Taste ===
The gum is remarkable for a bitter, medicinal taste.

=== Caffeine ===
According to the company, one piece of gum contains the same amount of caffeine as half a cup of coffee, which is about 40 milligrams.

== FDA investigation ==
Wrigley temporarily halted production and sales of its Alert energy gum as the Food and Drug Administration (FDA) investigates the safety of caffeinated-food products, especially the possible effects of caffeinated gum on children and adolescents.
