= 5 (gum) =

Chewing gum brand from Wrigley

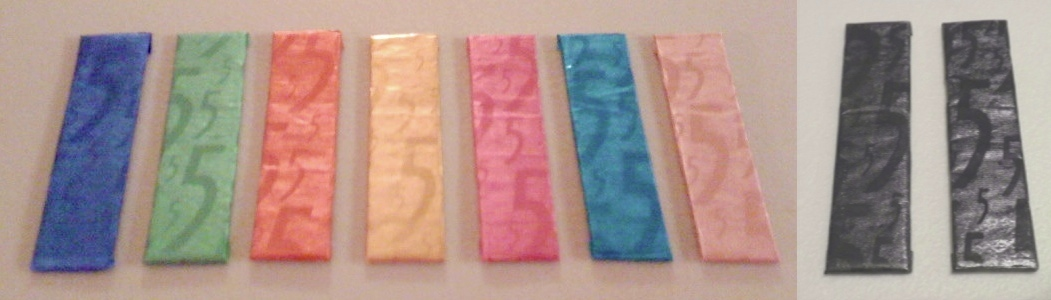
- Sticks of 5 gum in several flavors, L-R: Cobalt, Rain, Flare, Lush, Elixir, Solstice, Zing/Evolve, Mint React, Fruit React
- Product type: Chewing gum
- Current owner: Mars, Inc.
- Produced by: Wrigley Company
- Country: United States
- Introduced: 2007; 19 years ago
- Website: 5gum.com

5 is a brand of sugar-free chewing gum that is manufactured by the Wrigley Company, marketed toward teenagers. The name "5" hints at the five human senses (with the ad slogans "Stimulate Your Senses" and "How It Feels to Chew Five Gum") and that it has 5 calories.

5 gum was introduced in the United States in March 2007, in Canada in January 2008, in Russia, Europe and Australia in 2009, and in China, India, Italy, the Middle East, Egypt, Thailand, and Malaysia in 2010. When introduced to new markets, 5 would be stylized and branded as "New 5 Gum".

== Products ==
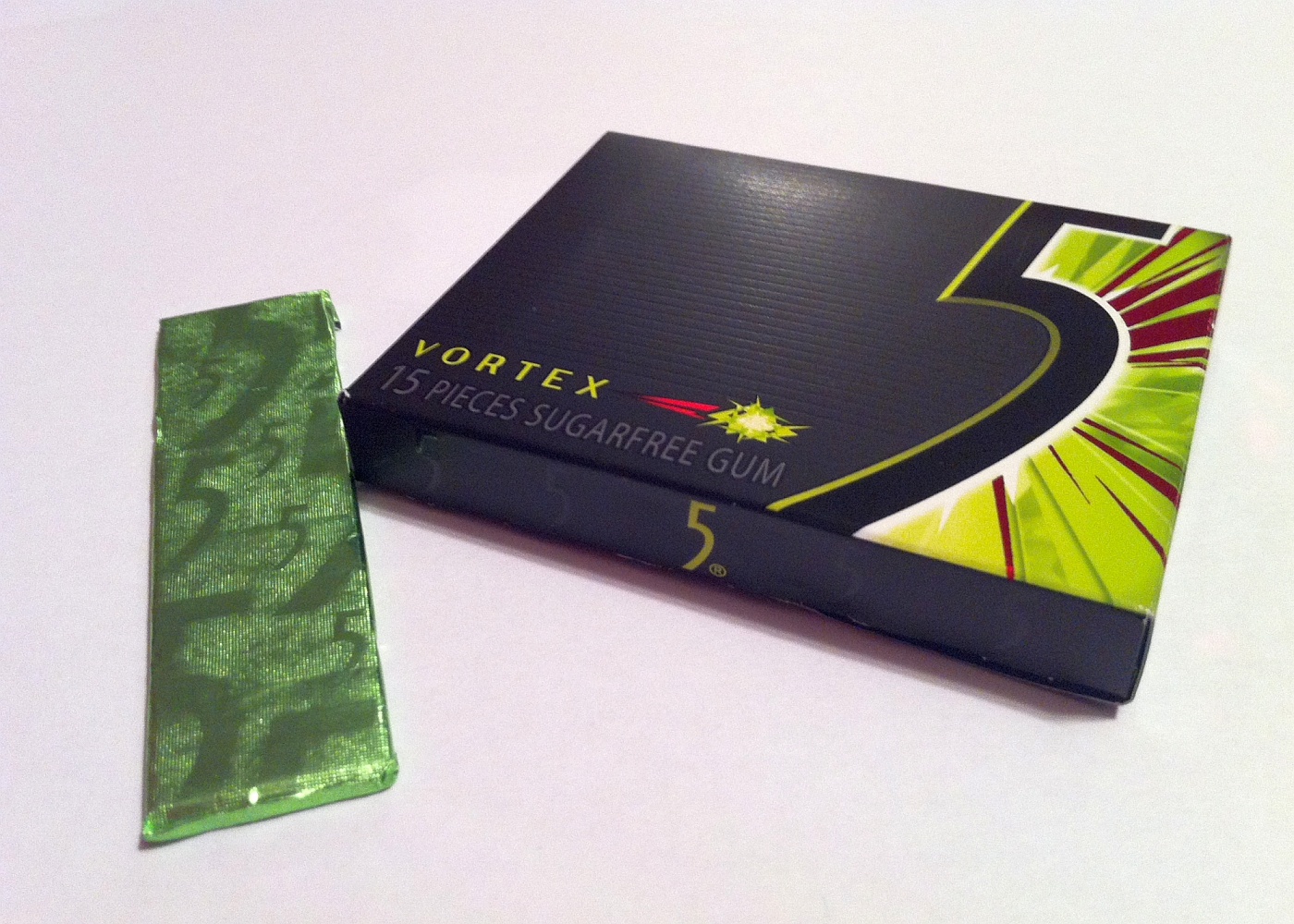
Package of 5 "Vortex" gum

The first three flavors introduced were Peppermint, Spearmint, and Cinnamon; second came Tropical and Berry; and in 2009, Winter mint and Bubble. In March 2010, two new flavors, both named "React" were introduced in the United States along with the slogan: "Everyone Experiences It Differently". "React" comes in both mint and fruit flavors. It was released in Australia in March 2011. 5 also offers a watermelon flavor called "Prism", a green apple flavor called "Vortex" and a sour tropical flavor called "Swerve".

A limited edition flavor called "Mutant" was released in Australia as a promotion for X-Men: First Class in May 2011. It was discontinued and later re-released as "Cirrus". Also, in June 2012, Wrigley released Cobalt and Rain micro-packs, bottle and mini bottle formats. The bottles contain pellet style gum instead of stick gum in the standard packs. The bottle format is available in Canada as well.

On 8 September 2020, 5 announced that it would be collaborating with Razer's gaming beverage brand "Respawn By Razer" (stylized as RΞSPAWN BY RΛZΞR) to bring 3 new flavors of 5 targeted towards gamers, claiming to enhance focus while gaming.

== Nutrition ==
There are five calories in a piece of 5 gum. The gum contains aspartame (with phenylalanine), acesulfame-potassium, soy lecithin, sorbitol, mannitol and other sweeteners.
