= Doublemint =

Brand of chewing gum

- Product type: Chewing gum
- Current owner: Wrigley Company
- Country: United States
- Introduced: 1914; 112 years ago
- Related brands: Juicy Fruit; Wrigley's Spearmint
- Website: mars.com/doublemint

Doublemint is a variety of chewing gum made by the Wrigley Company; according to early advertisements, it is "double strength" peppermint flavored. It was launched in the United States in 1914, and has had variable market share since then.

== The Doublemint Twins ==
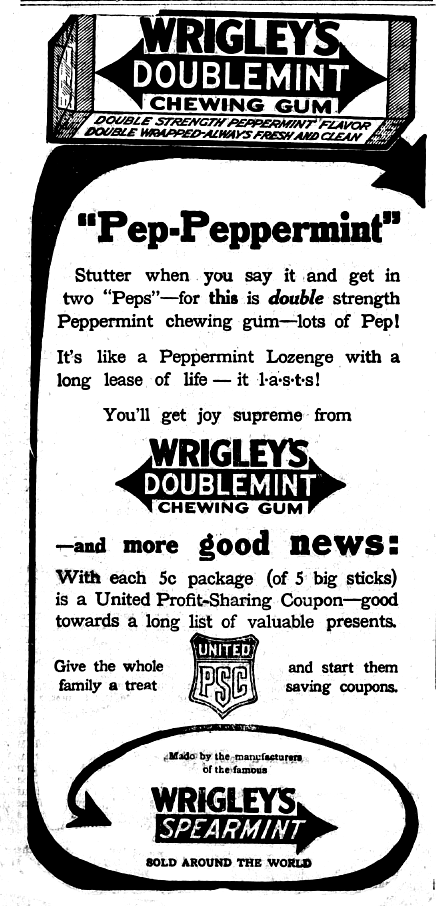
1914 newspaper ad for the new Doublemint

As a play on the word "double" in the name, one of the most notable aspects of this brand is the advertising campaign featuring identical twins wearing matching outfits. Beginning in 1939 with stylized illustrations of twins, advertisements continued with print ads and later television commercials, featuring actual twins as spokespersons.

The first set of women to portray the Doublemint Twins were sisters Marie and Mildred Maier of Silverhill, Alabama.

New Doublemint Twins were heard on the radio at WBBM-AM. Jane and Joan Boyd were regular performers as the Doublemint Twins on "The Music Wagon”, a program on WBBM from 1957 to 1963. This program was hosted by Mal Bellairs, whose notes indicate the understanding that the Boyds were the first Doublemint Twins.

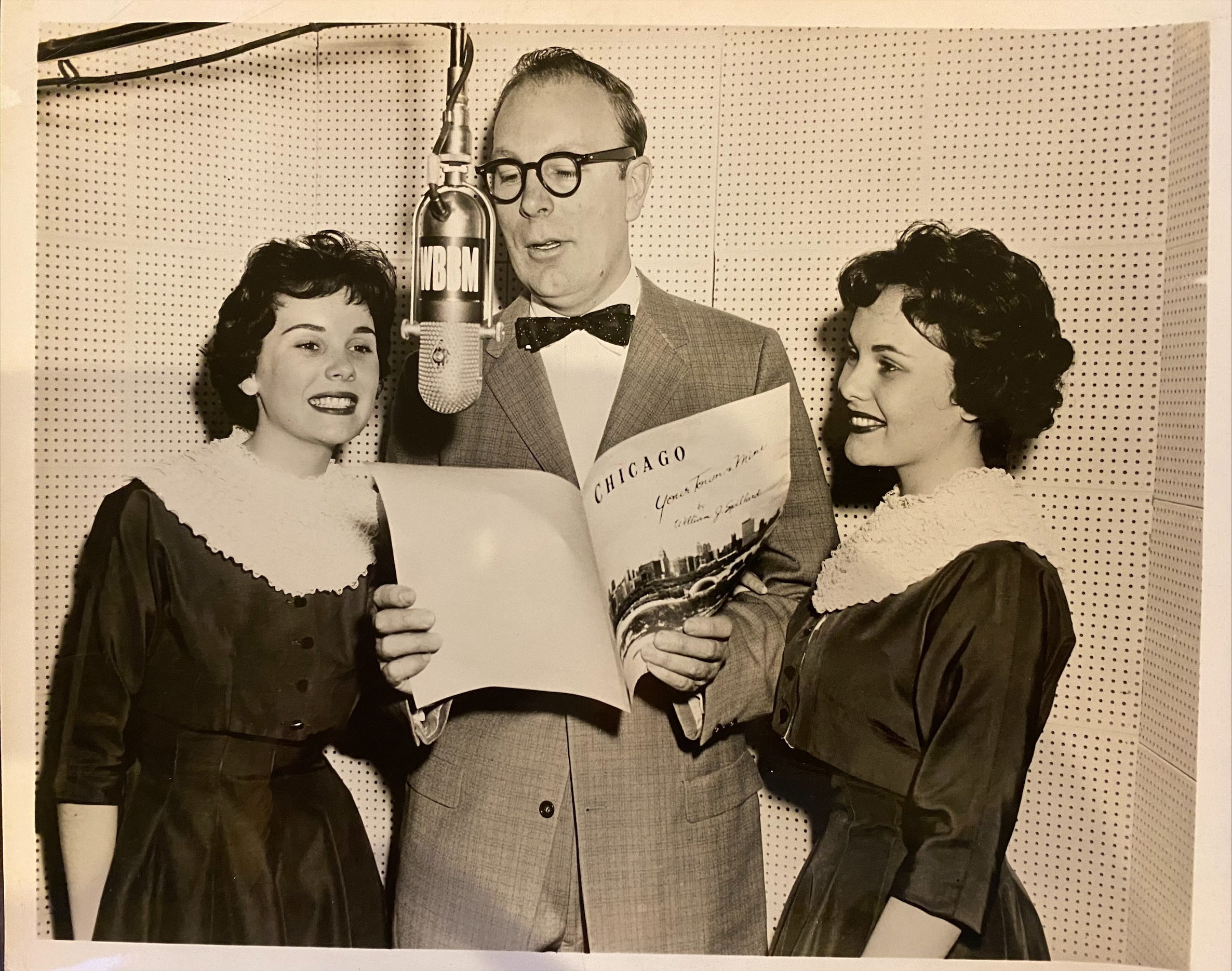
Mal Bellairs with the Doublemint Twins

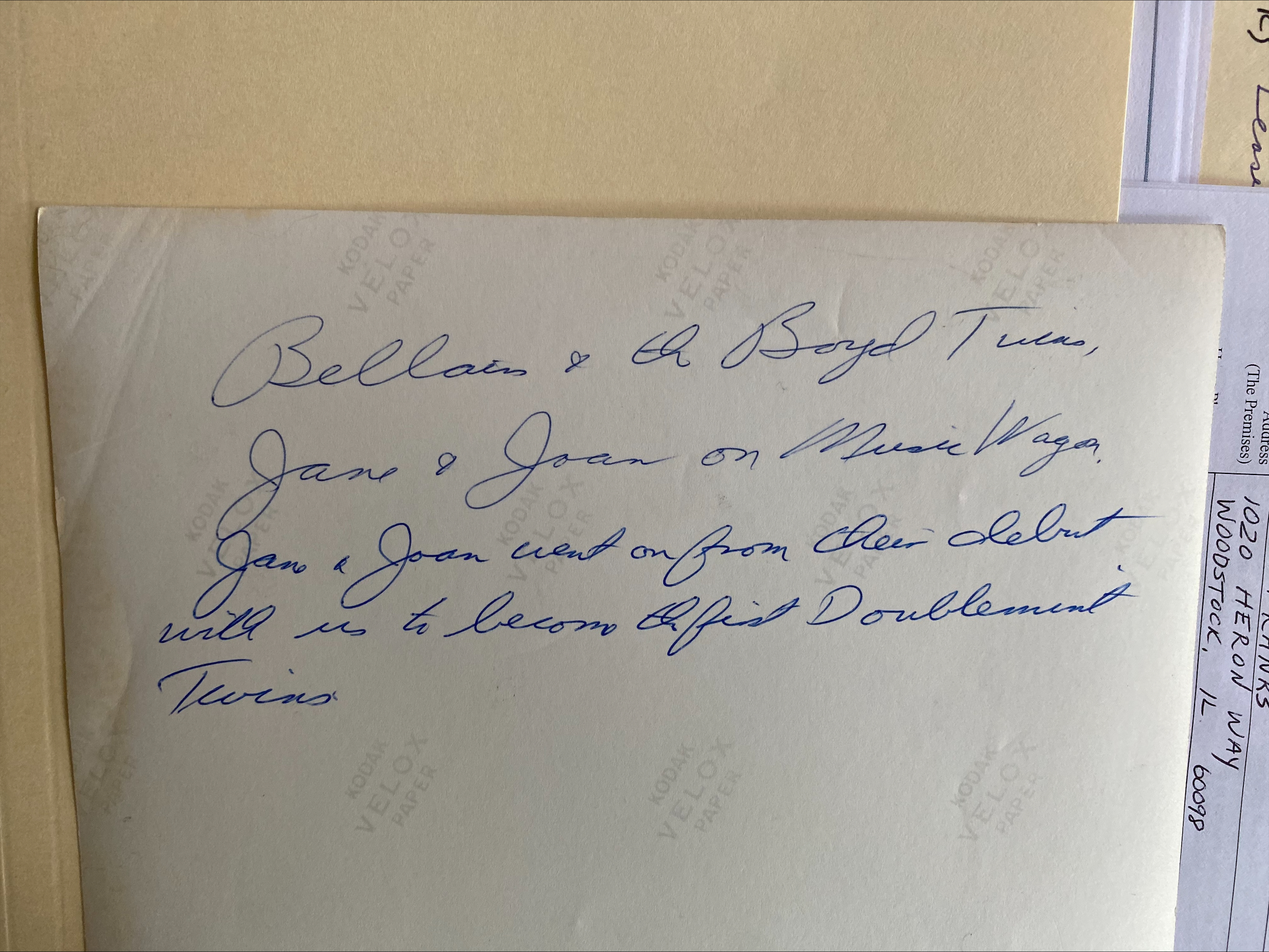
Mal Bellairs' handwritten note on back of photo: Bellairs & the Boyd Twins, Jane and Joan on Music Wagon. Jane and Joan went on from their debut with us to become the first Doublemint Twins.

External audio
- Boyd Twins
- The Music Wagon January 30, 1959, from Mal Bellairs' family's website

The first Doublemint Twins to appear on television came along in 1959. The role belonged to 21-year-old twins Jane and Joan Knoerzer (professionally using their mother's maiden name, Boyd) of Hammond, Indiana, who appeared in advertisements for Doublemint until 1963, when Joan became pregnant. The company, however, continued sporadically to promote the campaign, which included twins Jennie and Terrie Frankel in the late 1960s; later Doublemint Twins included June and Patricia Mackrell through the 1970s (who had also been the Toni Twins for Toni Home Permanent, which used the slogan "Which twin has the Toni?"), Patricia and Priscilla (a.k.a. Cybil or "Cyb") Barnstable, Denise and Dian Gallup, Cynthia and Brittany Daniel (future co-stars as the Wakefield twins in the TV series based on the Sweet Valley High novels), Tia and Tamera Mowry in the early '90s (future co-star of The Game with both Tia Mowry and Brittany Daniel and future co-stars of Sister, Sister), Heidi and Alissa Kramer, figure skaters Pamela and Jeremy Green, and Jean (née Barbara) and Elizabeth Sagal (daughters of TV director Boris Sagal and sisters of Married... with Children's Katey Sagal). The Sagal twins enjoyed a brief run as the stars of a sitcom, Double Trouble, in 1984. Later twins projected more sex appeal in keeping with trends in American advertising; the Barnstable twins were later asked to pose for Playboy due to their popularity as spokeswomen for the gum. In 1987, Denise and Dian Gallup spoofed their roles as the Doublemint Twins in cameo roles in the Mel Brooks film Spaceballs.

== "Doublemint" trademark denied in EU ==
In 2004, the European Union Court of Justice ultimately denied Wrigley's request for trademark status on the name "Doublemint"; the Court found that the mark DOUBLEMINT was descriptive of the product and in violation of trademark law.

== Known ingredients ==
The flavorings used in Doublemint gum are a trade secret, but the company does say that the main flavor ingredient is peppermint. Although it is not a sugarless gum, in 2003 Wrigley's replaced some of the sugar with artificial sweeteners aspartame and acesulfame potassium.

Listed

Sugar, gum base, dextrose, corn syrup, natural and artificial flavors; less than 2% of glycerol, aspartame, gum arabic, soy lecithin, acesulfame K, color (titanium dioxide, blue 1 lake, beta-carotene), BHT

== 2008 commercial ==
R&B singer Chris Brown performed a modified version of "Forever" in a 2008 commercial for Doublemint, which introduced a thinner Plen-T-Pack package.
