= Freedent =

Brand of chewing gum

- Freedent logo in the US
- Product type: Chewing gum
- Current owner: Mars, Inc.
- Produced by: Wrigley Company
- Introduced: 1975; 51 years ago
- Related brands: Orbit, Eclipse
- Website: mars.com/freedent

Freedent is a brand of chewing gum manufactured by Wrigley's, first introduced in 1975. It is marketed as the gum that "won't stick to most dental work (or braces)." Freedent currently comes in two flavors in the American market: Peppermint and Spearmint; in the past it also offered other flavors.

The Freedent brand is also used in France as a rebranding of Orbit/Extra. It launched there in 1987. It has also been marketed as such in the Netherlands.

== History ==
Freedent was first developed by the Wrigley Company after receiving a large amount of feedback from customers who had issues with regular gum sticking to their dental work. Freedent was designed using a new type of gum base that would not stick to most dental work, allowing those who had trouble chewing traditional gum to chew it with minimal sticking. At the time of its debut in 1975, it was the first new major Wrigley's brand to be released in the US in 53 years. It was also released that same year in the British market.

In 2001, Freedent added a pellet package as the Canadian version of Orbit White. In the mid-2000s, the pellet version was renamed Freedent Total. By June 2006, Wrigley's had withdrawn the Freedent Total line from Canada and replaced it with Excel White. Freedent continued its Canadian sales in sticks only, but with similar packaging to the American Orbit and the Canadian Extra.

As of 2009, the Freedent brand was active in the US, Canada, France and New Zealand.
