= Wrigley's Spearmint =

Brand of chewing gum

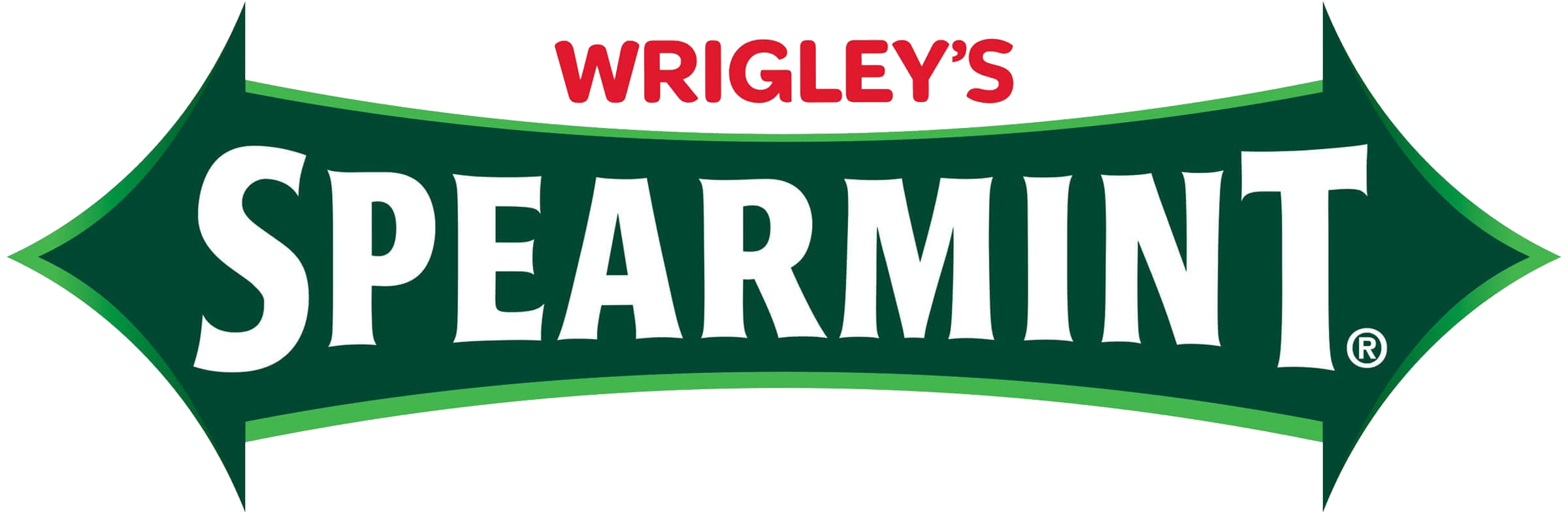

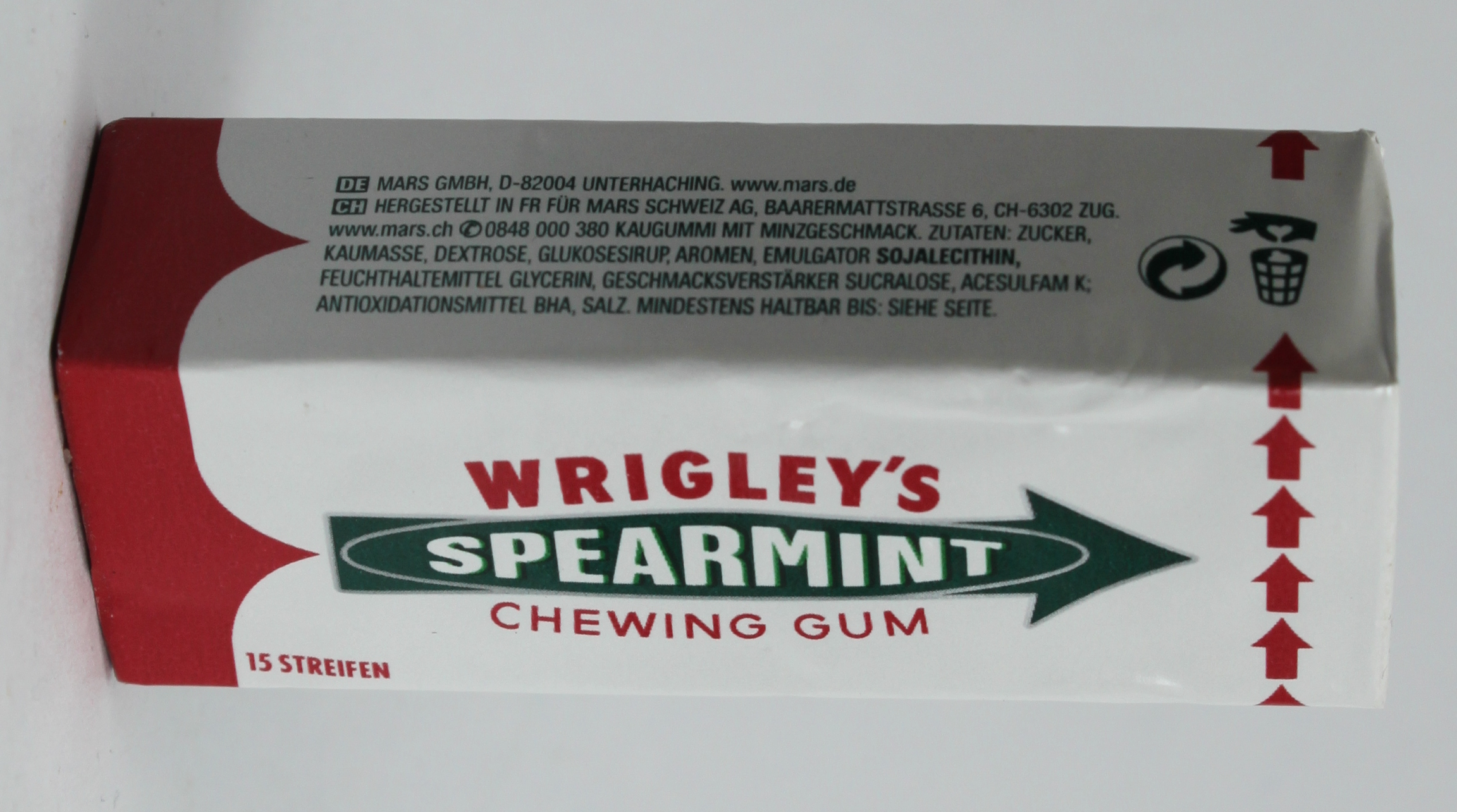
- Product type: Chewing gum
- Current owner: Mars, Inc.
- Produced by: Wrigley Company
- Country: United States
- Introduced: 1893; 133 years ago
- Related brands: Juicy Fruit; Doublemint

Wrigley's Spearmint is a brand of Wrigley's chewing gum. Wrigley's launched the brand in 1893, and marketed the gum as its classic brand, although the company's brand Juicy Fruit has been on the market slightly longer. As the name implies, the gum is flavored with the spearmint plant.

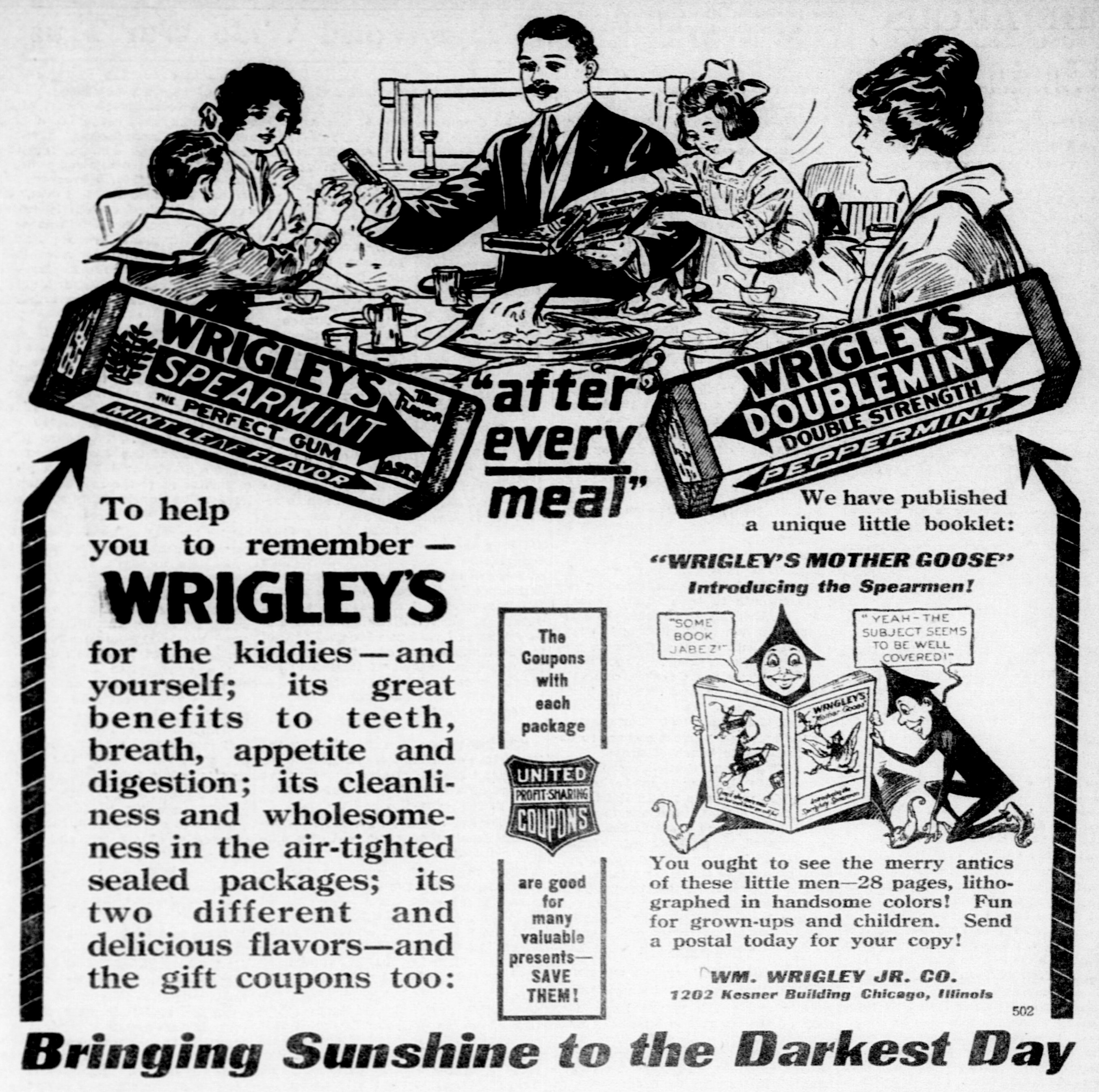
Spearmint ad of 1915

A drop in advertising rates in 1907 led the company to invest in expanding advertising activity, with Wrigley's Spearmint gaining market share. The gum was marketed as having health benefits. "Spearmen" characters were also used in early advertising campaigns for the gum. The product achieved over $1 million in sales in 1908, and by 1911 it was the most popular chewing gum in the US. In 1912, National Magazine wrote an article about William Wrigley and the success of Wrigley's Spearmint.

The company took the unusual move of providing the US Armed Forces with their entire output of Wrigley's Spearmint, during World War II, as shortages meant production was limited during the war, whilst continuing to advertise so people remembered the brand and products.

In 2004, it was relaunched in the United States and United Kingdom, with the slogan "even better, longer lasting". Another advertising campaign was "some call it a spear, some call it an arrow." The spear/arrow has been a constant in the brand's advertising, as has been the mint leaf motif.

The gum was traditionally grey/beige in color, almost the same color as Juicy Fruit and Doublemint.

At the end of 2022 the manufacturer Mars, which has been producing Wrigley's Spearmint since 2008, stopped its production in Germany. The stated reasons were "declining developments" and the associated poor sales figures. According to Mars customer service, the chewing gum range now only contains dragées, with no gum sticks.
