= Hubba Bubba =

Brand of bubble gum

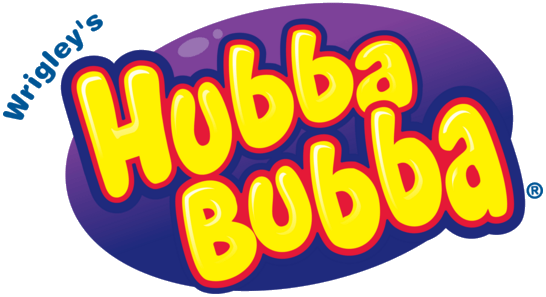
- Product type: Bubble gum
- Current owner: Mars, Incorporated
- Produced by: Wrigley Company
- Country: United States
- Introduced: 1979; 47 years ago
- Markets: Worldwide
- Website: hubbabubba.com

Hubba Bubba is a brand of bubble gum produced by Wm. Wrigley Jr. Company, a subsidiary of Mars, Incorporated, and sold worldwide. Introduced in the United States in 1979, the bubble gum got its name from the phrase "Hubba Hubba", which some military personnel in World War II used to express approval. The main gimmick used to promote the gum is that, as Hubba Bubba is less sticky than other brands of gum, it is easier to peel off the skin after a bubble bursts.

When Hubba Bubba was first marketed, the gum's flavor (now often referred to as original) was similar to that of others but, over time, different flavors have been produced (such as cherry, cola, peach, strawberry, lime, and salty liquorice), with availability differing between markets worldwide.

== Creation ==
Before its launch, Hubba Bubba had been referred to as "Stagecoach" during product development and early manufacturing at the now-defunct Wrigley plant in Santa Cruz, California.

Hubba Bubba's main competition for most of the 1980s was the brand Bubblicious.

At first, Hubba Bubba was only available in chunks. It has since been produced as shredded pieces, rolls of bubble gum tape, plastic jugs of crystals, boxes of tiny gumballs and stuffed with candy.

== Advertising ==
The earliest series of TV commercials for Hubba Bubba that aired in the United States were set in a Wild West town and featured a character known as the Gumfighter, played by actor Don Collier. At the end of each commercial, the Gum Fighter declared, "Big bubbles, no troubles," followed by a jocular response from Western film veteran Dub Taylor. This was a reference to Hubba Bubba being less sticky than other brands.

In the United States, commercials for the gum are animated at Aardman, in the same stop-motion style used in Wallace and Gromit, the Chevron commercials and Chicken Run. In Canada, commercials are animated in 2D traditional animation by Chuck Gammage Animation and use a duo of cartoon characters named Hubba (purple) and Bubba (pink). It was also used in the closing credits sequence on the popular YTV game show Uh Oh!.

== Ingredients ==
This product as sold in the US includes bioengineered (Genetically Modified or “GMO”) ingredients and the company labels as such without specifying which ingredients are the un-named GMO’s.
