= Wrigley Company =

American candy and gum company

Wm. Wrigley Jr. Company

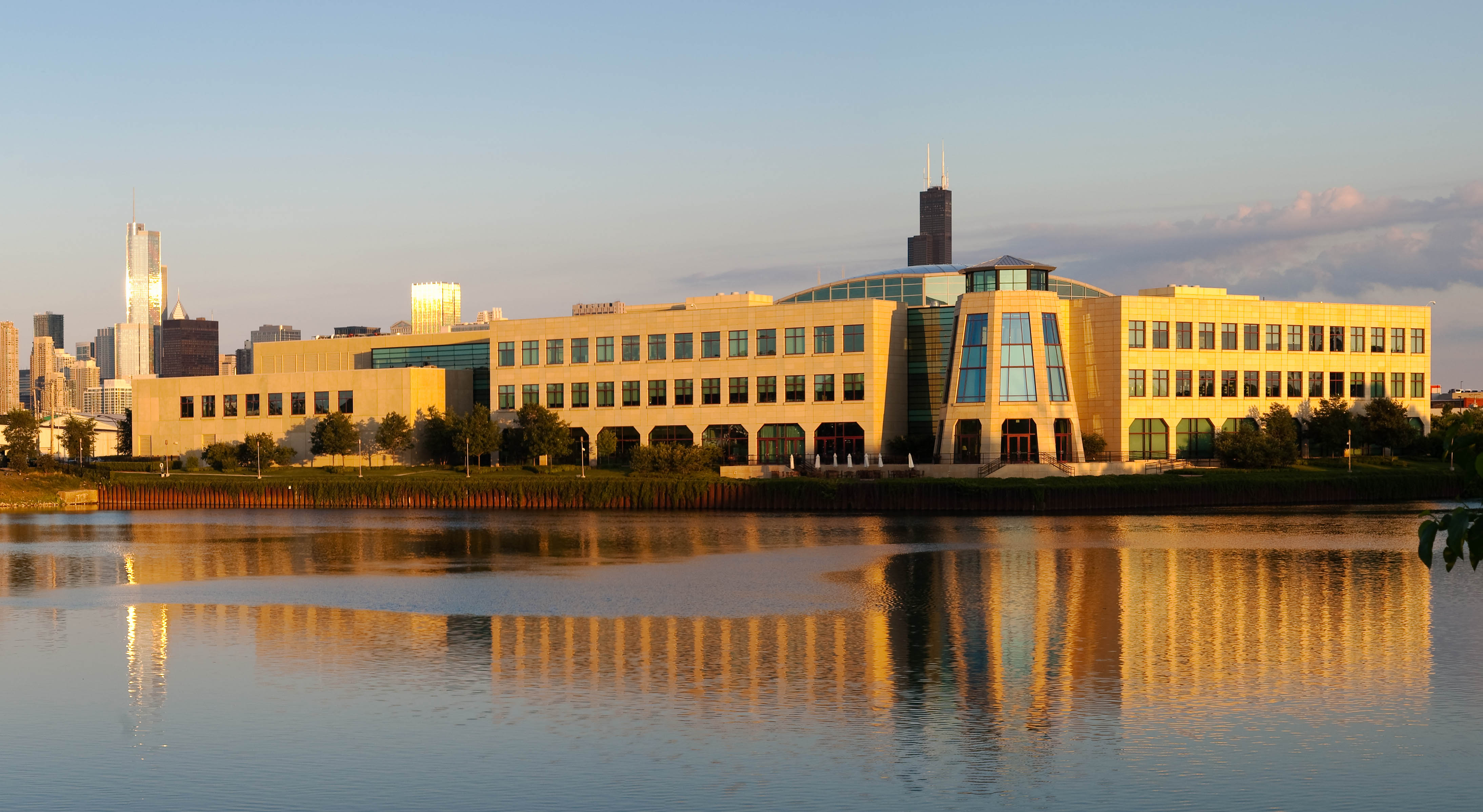
- Wrigley Global Innovation Center in Chicago, company headquarters
- Type: Subsidiary
- Industry: Food
- Founded: April 1, 1891; 135 years ago Chicago, Illinois, U.S.
- Founder: William Wrigley Jr.
- Fate: Acquired by Mars, Inc. in 2008
- Headquarters: Global Innovation Center, Goose Island (Chicago), Illinois, U.S.
- Area served: Worldwide
- Key people: Andrew Clarke (global president); William Wrigley Jr. II (former chairman)
- Products: Bubble and chewing gum Confectionery
- Brands: (see below)
- Revenue: ▲$5.389 billion (2007)
- Net income: ▲$961.9 million (2009)
- Number of employees: 16,000
- Parent: Mars Snacking
- Subsidiaries: A. Korkunov

Wm. Wrigley Jr. Company, also known as the Wrigley Company or simply Wrigley's, is an American multinational candy and chewing gum company, based in the Global Innovation Center (GIC) in Goose Island, Chicago, Illinois. Founded in 1891, it is currently the largest manufacturer and marketer of chewing gum in the world.

For almost a century, the Wrigley Company continuously marketed three brands of gum: Wrigley's Spearmint, Doublemint, and Juicy Fruit. Since the late 20th century, it has expanded and created multiple additional brands. Wrigley's became a subsidiary of Mars Inc. in 2008, and, along with Mars chocolate bars and other candy products, makes up "Mars Wrigley Confectionery" (now Mars Snacking).

The company currently sells its products in 184 countries and districts, operates in 62 countries, and has 21 production facilities in 14 countries.

== History ==
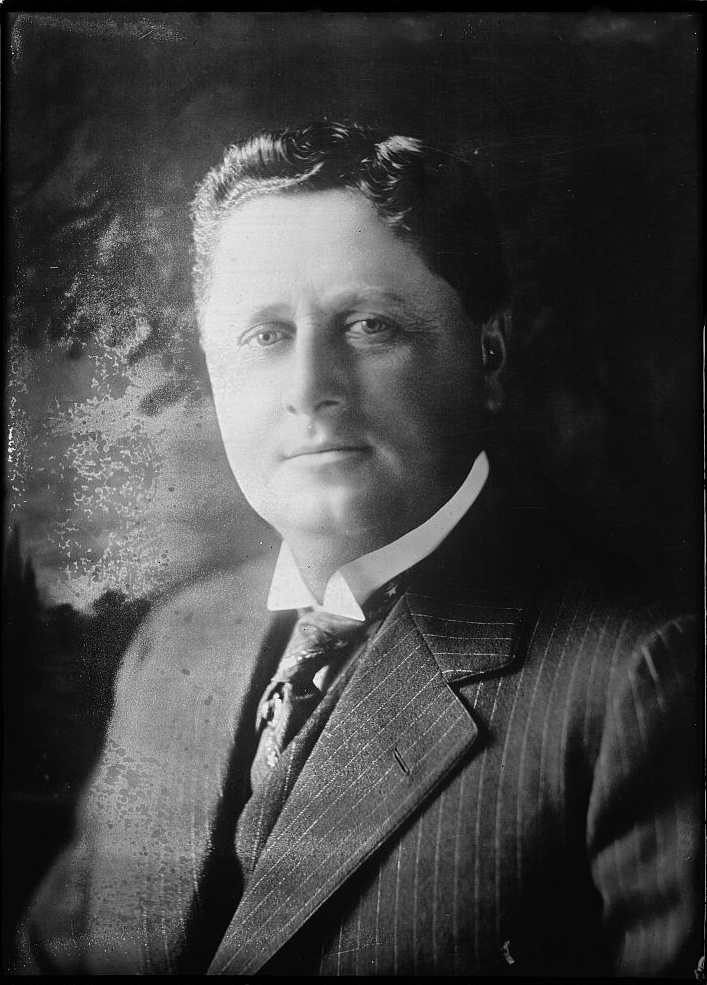
William Wrigley Jr., the founder of the Wrigley company

The company was founded on April 1, 1891, in Chicago, Illinois by William Wrigley Jr. Wrigley's gum was traditionally made out of chicle, sourced largely from Central America. In 1952, in response to Decree 900, land reforms attempting to end feudal working conditions for peasant farmers in Guatemala, Wrigley's discontinued purchasing chicle from that country.

Wrigley's announced the closure of its Santa Cruz, California manufacturing plant in April 1996. The plant had been built in 1955. The 385,000-square-foot manufacturing facility was put on the market in October 1996 for US$11.3 million, or about $30 a square foot.

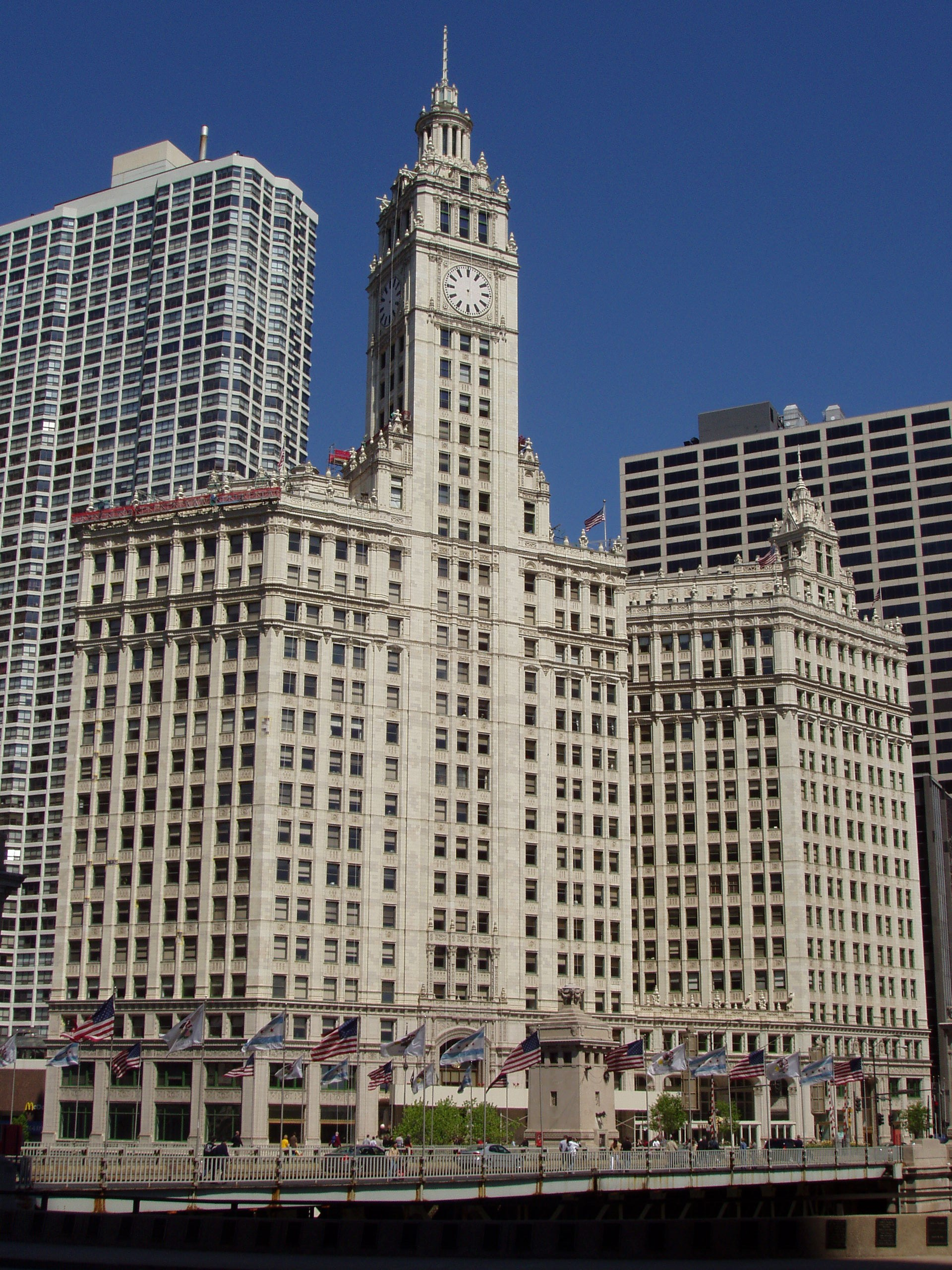
The Wrigley Building, company's headquarters until 2011

In 2005, Wrigley purchased Life Savers and Altoids from Kraft Foods for US$1.5 billion. On January 23, 2007, Wrigley signed a purchase agreement to acquire an 80% initial interest in Russian chocolatier A. Korkunov for $300 million with the remaining 20% to be acquired over time. On April 28, 2008, Mars, Incorporated announced that it would acquire Wrigley for approximately $23 billion. The sale price represented a significant premium to Wm. Wrigley Jr.’s market capitalization, which stood at $17.3 billion. Financing for the transaction was provided by Berkshire Hathaway, Goldman Sachs, and JPMorgan; Berkshire Hathaway held a minority equity investment in Wrigley until October 2016, when Mars took full control over the company.

The Wrigley Building on Michigan Avenue, a landmark on Chicago's Magnificent Mile, was the company's global headquarters until 2011, when it was sold to an investor group that included Zeller Realty Group as well as Groupon co-founders Eric Lefkofsky and Brad Keywell. The company has been headquartered in the GIC since 2012.

In 2016, Mars announced that Wrigley would be merged with its chocolate segment, Mars Chocolate North America, LLC, to form a new subsidiary, Mars Wrigley Confectionery. The new company would maintain global offices in Chicago, while moving its U.S. offices to Hackettstown and Newark, New Jersey.

In May 2021, the company filed a lawsuit against five companies for marketing cannabis-infused edibles that closely resembled its Skittles, Starburst, and Life Savers brands. On October 16, 2023, Judge John W. Holcomb approved a final judgment by consent in the case between Wm. Wrigley Jr. Company and Green Rush Extracts LLC. The defendants agreed to a permanent injunction and significant monetary remedies for willful trademark infringement and counterfeiting.

== People ==
=== 1891–1932: William Wrigley Jr. ===
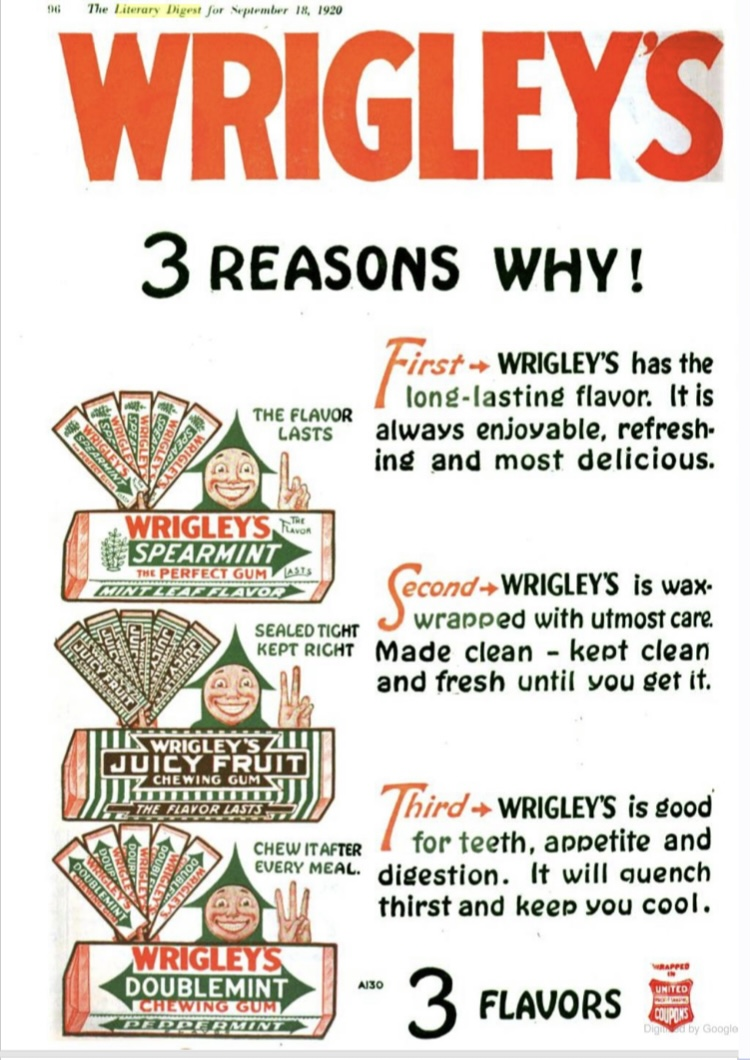
Advertisement for three flavors of Wrigley's chewing gum (1920)

In 1891, 29-year-old William Wrigley Jr. (1861–1932) came to Chicago from Philadelphia with $32 and the idea to start a business selling Wrigley's Scouring Soap. Wrigley offered premiums as an incentive to buy his soap, such as baking powder. Later in his career, he switched to the baking powder business, in which he began offering two packages of chewing gum for each purchase of a can of baking powder. The popular premium, chewing gum, began to seem more promising, prompting another switch in product focus. Wrigley also became the majority owner of the Chicago Cubs in 1921.

=== 1932–1961: Philip K. Wrigley ===
After William Wrigley Jr. died, his son Philip K. Wrigley (1894–1977) assumed his father's position as CEO of the Wrigley Company. Wrigley is most well known for his unusual move to support US troops and protect the reputation of the Wrigley brand during World War II, in which he dedicated the entire output of Wrigley's Spearmint, Doublemint, and Juicy Fruit to the US Armed Forces. Wrigley launched the "Remember this Wrapper" ad campaign to keep the Wrigley brands on the minds of the customers during times of wartime rationing. Wrigley's P.K. brand was named after P.K. Wrigley.

=== 1961–1999: William Wrigley III ===
In 1961, Philip K. Wrigley handed control to his son, William Wrigley III (1933–1999). Wrigley led a strategic global expansion by establishing Wrigley facilities in nine new countries. On June 26, 1974, a Marsh Supermarket in Troy, Ohio installed the first bar code scanning equipment. The first product to be scanned using a Universal Product Code (UPC) bar code was a 10-pack of Wrigley's Juicy Fruit gum. (A facsimile of this pack of gum is now on display at the Smithsonian Institution's National Museum of American History.) In 1984, Wrigley introduced a new gum, Extra, which followed the new trend of sugar-free gums in the US. Wrigley also assumed control of the Chicago Cubs after his father's death in 1977, and sold the team to the Chicago Tribune in 1981.

=== 1999–2006: William Wrigley IV ===
William "Beau" Wrigley IV (1963–), following the death of Wrigley III (his father), led the sugar-free gum campaign across Europe, Australia, Spain, India, and China. In 2005, Kraft Foods sold the Life Savers and Altoids businesses to Wrigley in exchange for $1.5 billion as part of a reorganization plan. Wrigley helped establish the Wrigley Science Institute (WSI) in 2006 to study the oral health benefits of gum chewing. The WSI investigates the effects of gum chewing on weight management, stress relief, concentration, and oral health.

=== 2006–2008: William Perez ===
On October 23, 2006, William D. Perez (1948–) succeeded Bill Wrigley as CEO, becoming the first person outside the Wrigley family to head the company. In 2007, the company debuted 5 Gum in the United States. The 5 Gum brand was marketed using cinematic TV commercials portraying "How it feels to chew 5 Gum." Perez led the efforts of improving slimmer packaging (Slim Pack) with flavor improvements across both Extra and Wrigley brands.

=== 2008–2011: Dushan "Duke" Petrovich ===
Dushan Petrovich (1954–) succeeded Perez almost immediately after Mars, Incorporated's 2008 purchase of Wrigley. In 2009, Wrigley's Global Innovation Center received the LEED Gold Certification through Wrigley's commitment to global sustainability. In the 2010 Olympic Games in Vancouver, British Columbia, Wrigley was the Official Confectionery Supplier of the games, in which the company sported Olympic-themed packs and products.

=== 2011–2017: Martin Radvan ===
Martin Radvan became the president of the Wrigley Company after Petrovich. He was responsible for the company's worldwide strategy, operations, and business performance.

== Subsidiaries ==
- The Wrigley Company Limited
- Amurol Confections Company
- Northwestern Flavors, LLC

== Brands ==
=== Gum ===
United States

- Juicy Fruit (1893)
- Spearmint (1893)
- Doublemint (1914)
- Freedent (1975)
- Big Red (1975)
- Orbit (1976)
- Hubba Bubba (1979)
- Extra (1984)
- Winterfresh (1994) (Note: Reintroduced 2001.)
- Eclipse (2001)
- 5 (2007)

Canada

- 5
- Doublemint
- Excel
- Excel Mist
- Excel White
- Extra
- Extra Professional
- Extra Professional White
- Hubba Bubba
- Juicy Fruit
- Freedent
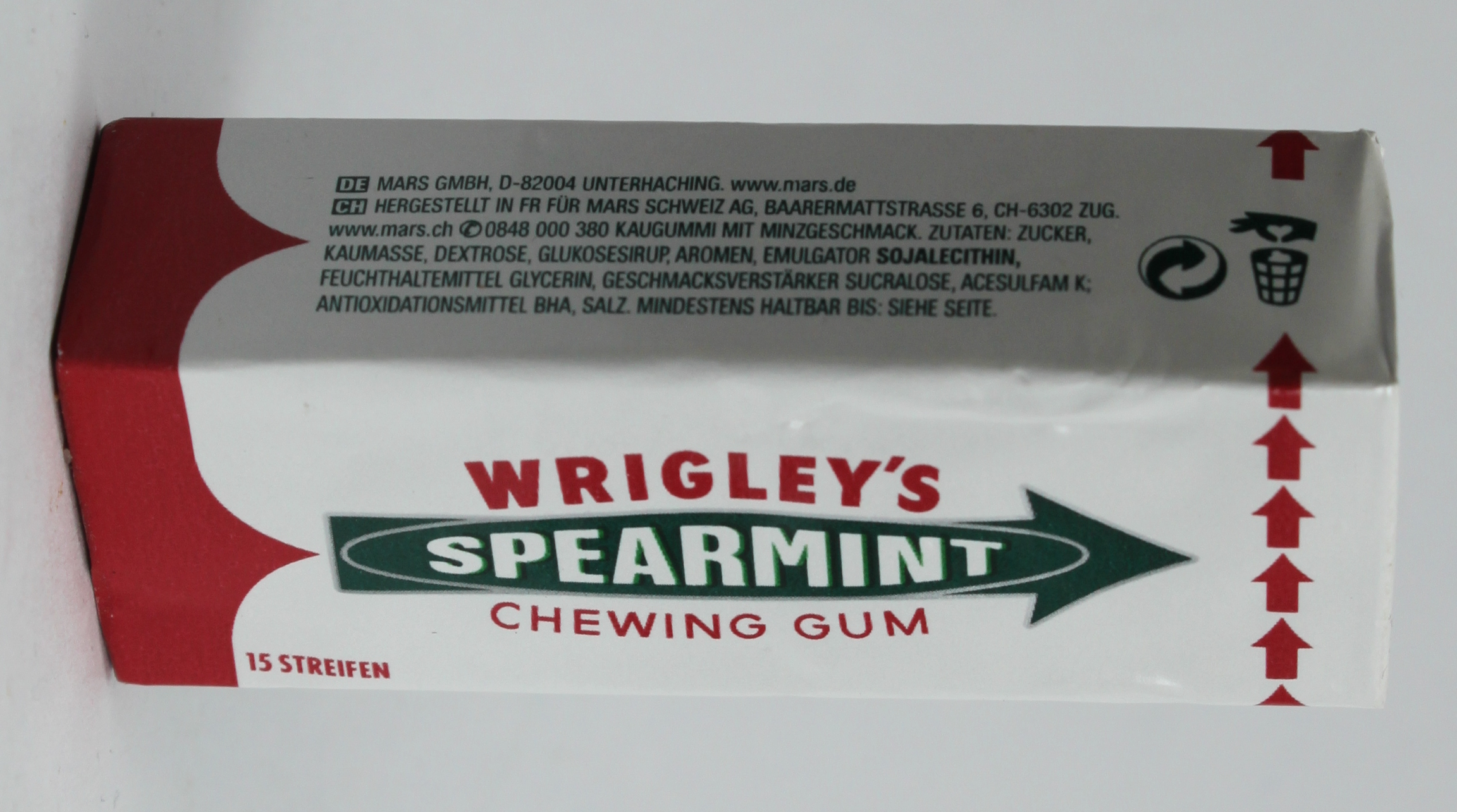
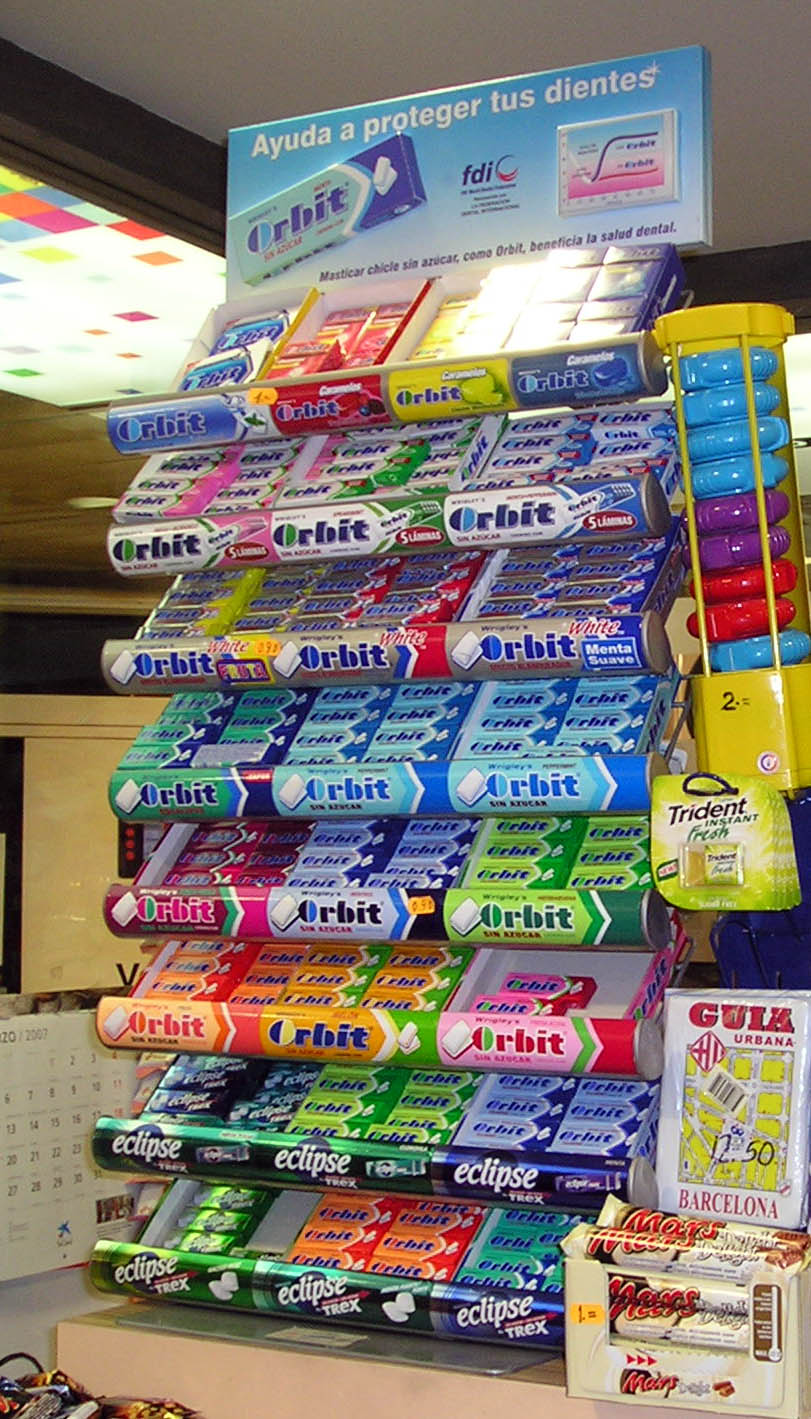
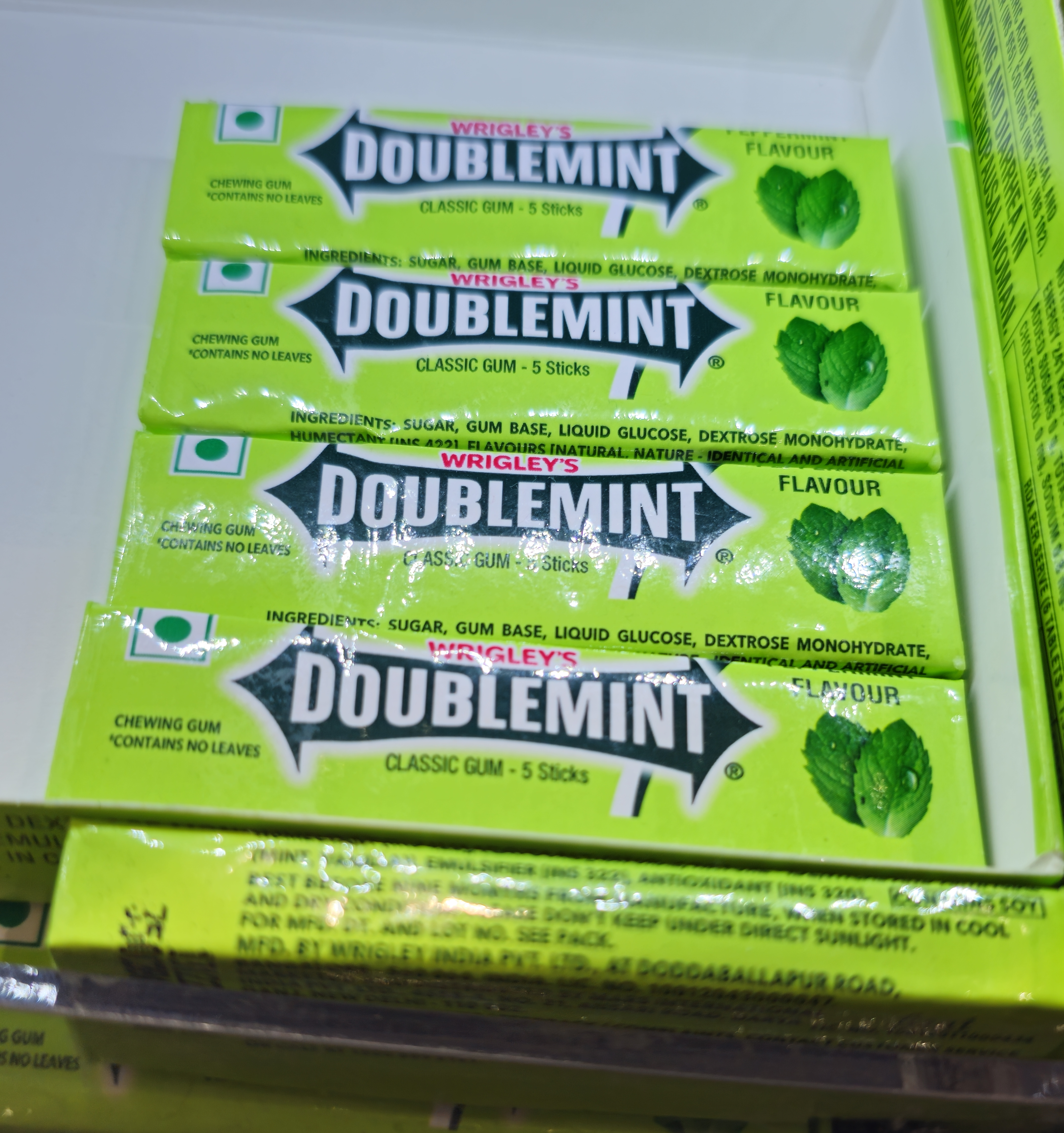
Fltr: Wrigley's Spearmint, Orbit, and Doublemint gums

The Wrigley Company Ltd., Estover, Plymouth, UK

- Airwaves
- Hubba Bubba
- Doublemint
- Extra
- Altoids
- Juicy Fruit
- Tunes
- Rondo (Note: A mint flavored candy brand owned by Wrigley Company. It was, prior to 2008, a brand of parent company Mars Incorporated.)
- Wrigley's Spearmint
- Lockets
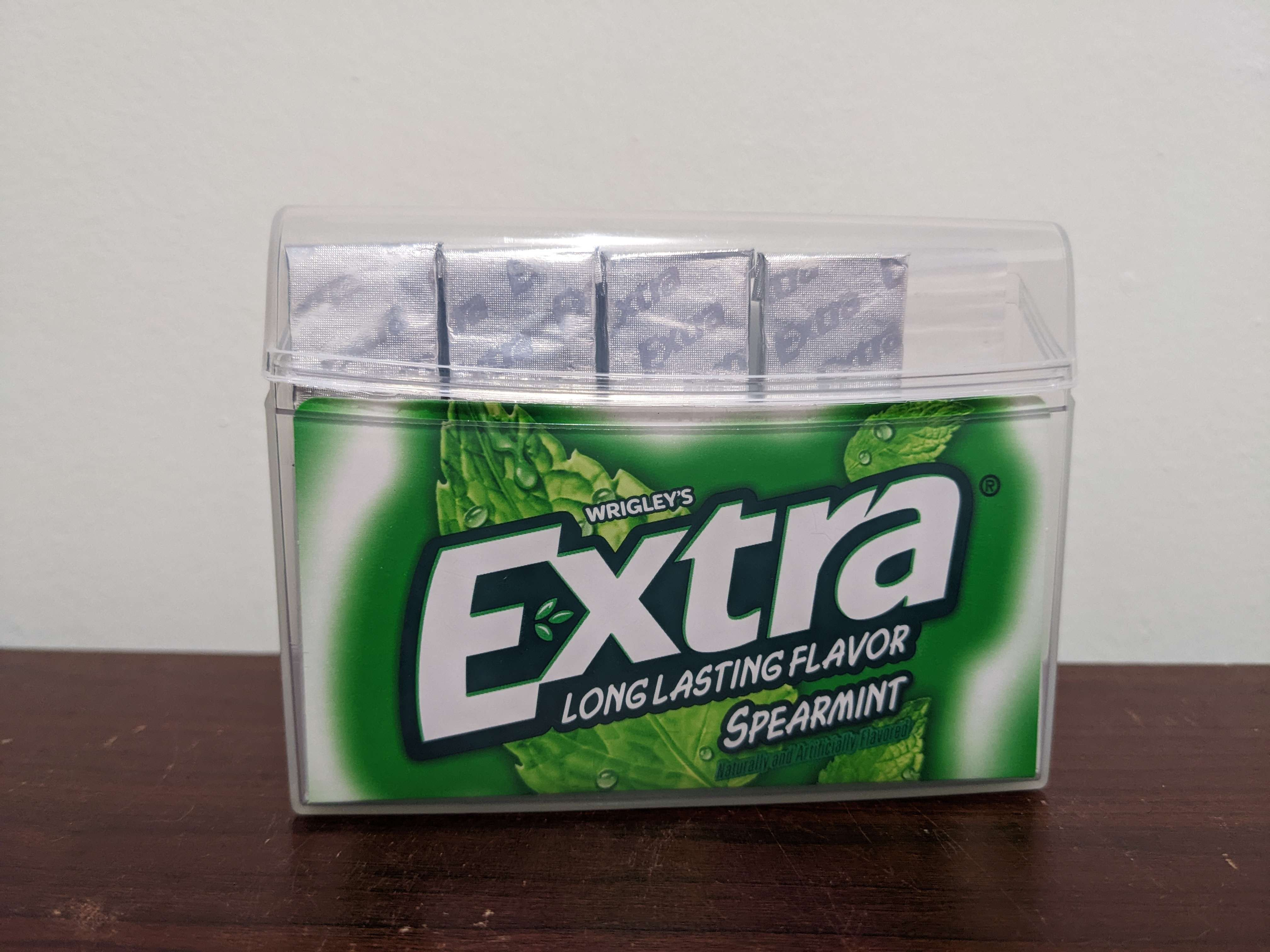
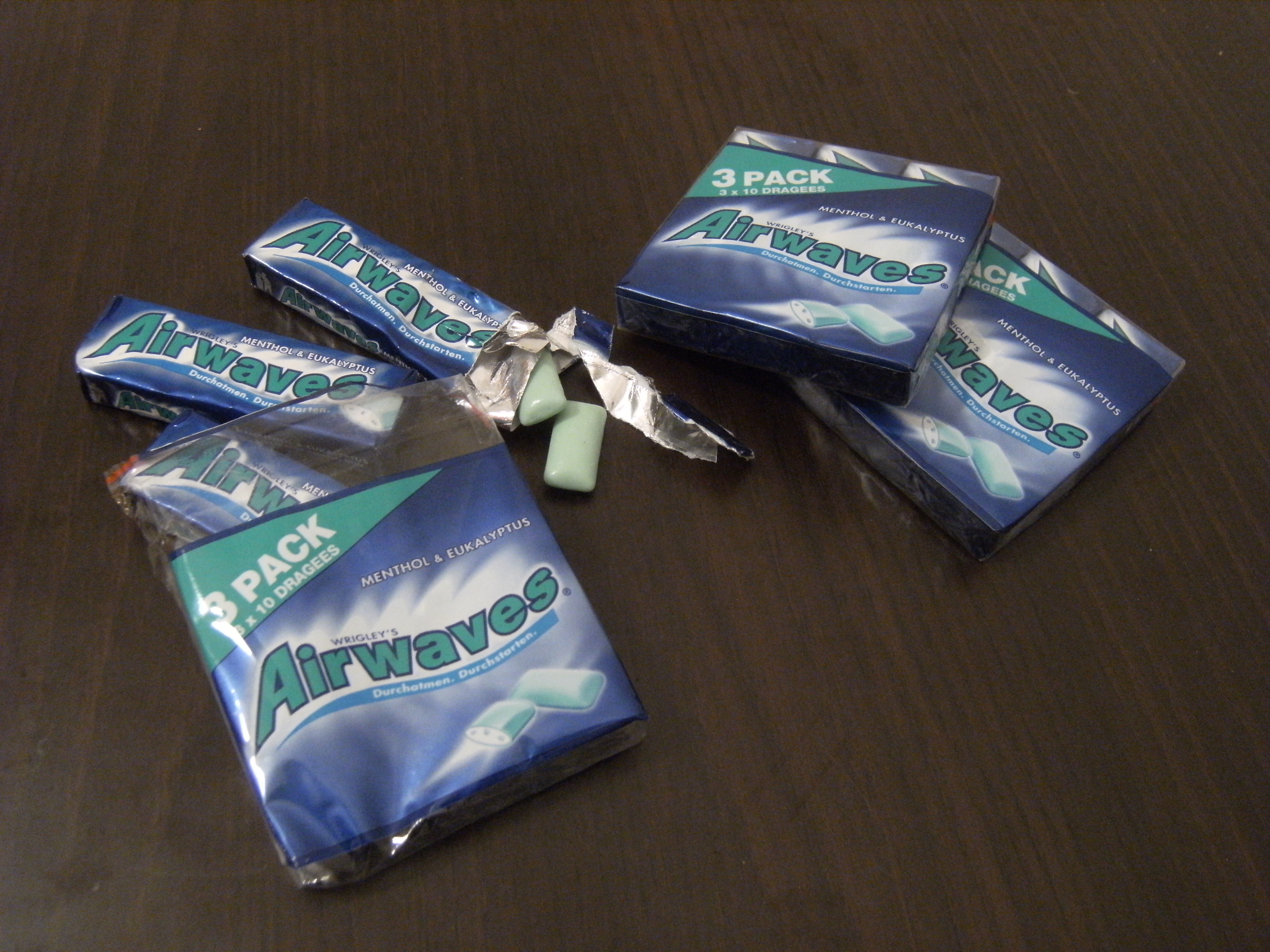
Wrigley's Extra (left) and Airwaves gums

Additional products and brands

- Altoids
- Big Boy
- Big G
- Big League Chew (Note: Until November 2010.)
- Boomer
- Bubble Tape
- Cool Air
- Eclipse
- Excel
- Hubba Bubba
- Life Savers (Note: Including the Minis and Fusion typs.)
- Gummi Savers
- Creme Savers
- PimPom
- P.K.
- Skittles
- Solano
- Starburst
- Sugus
- Lockets
- TaTa
- Tunes
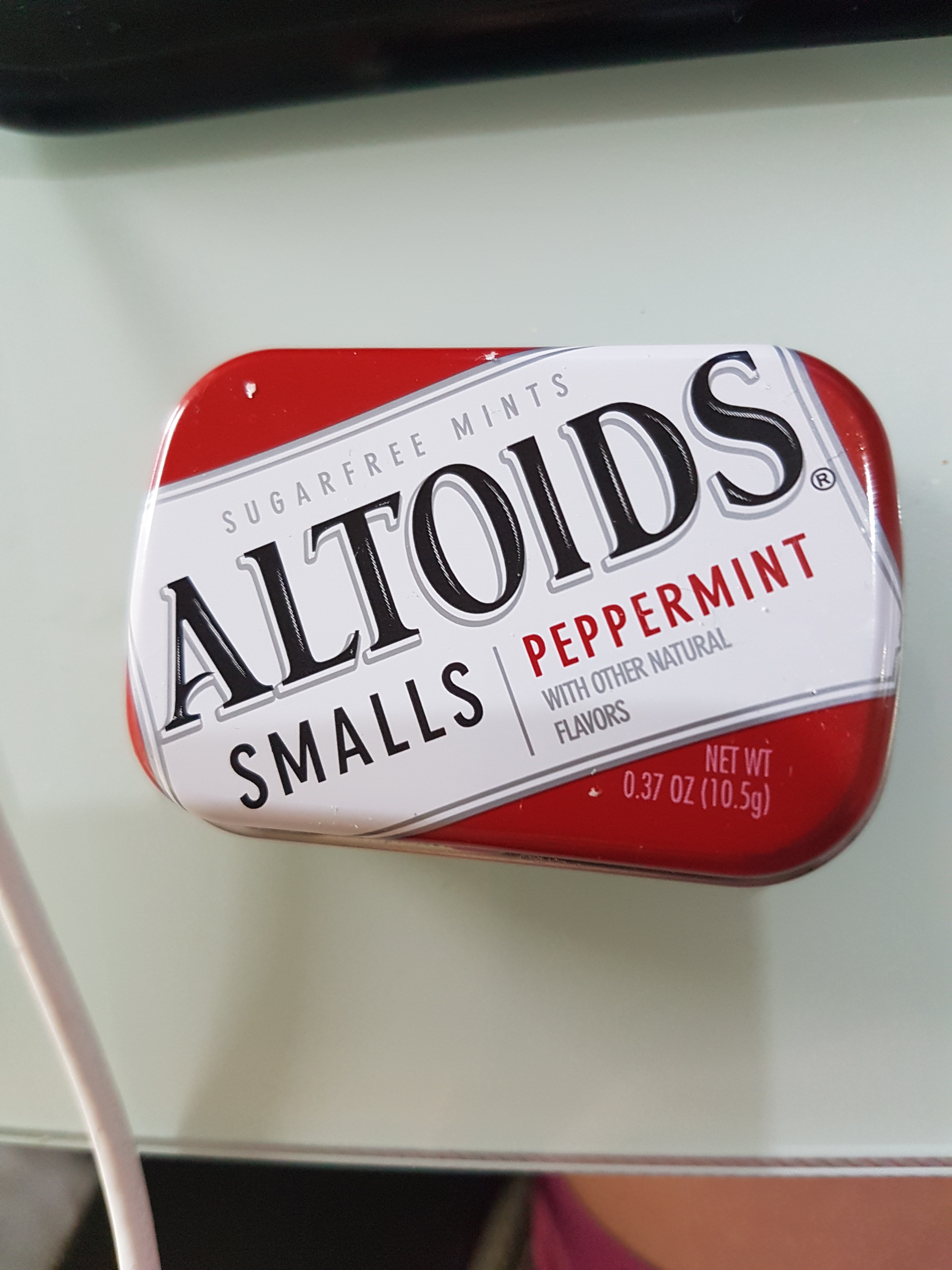
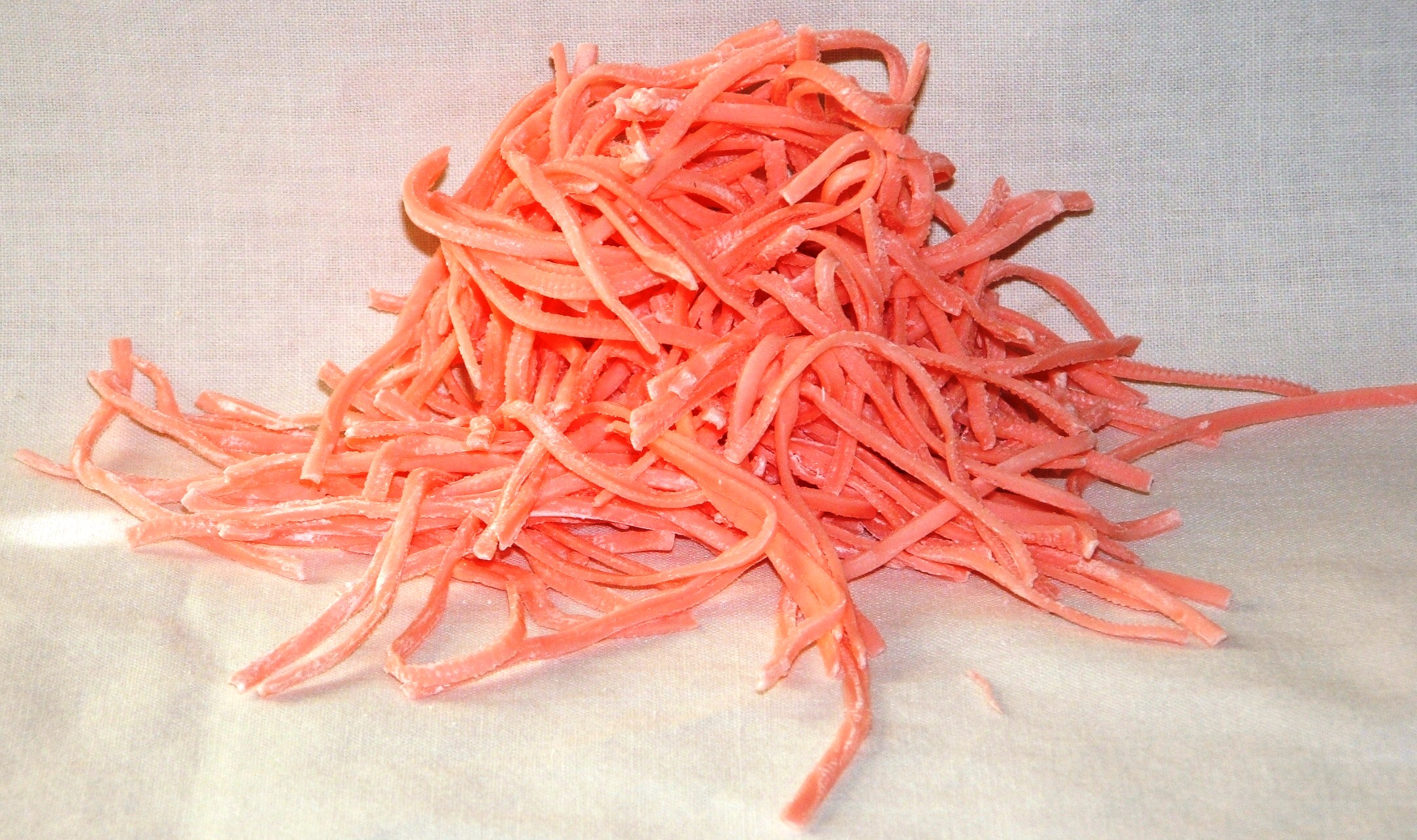
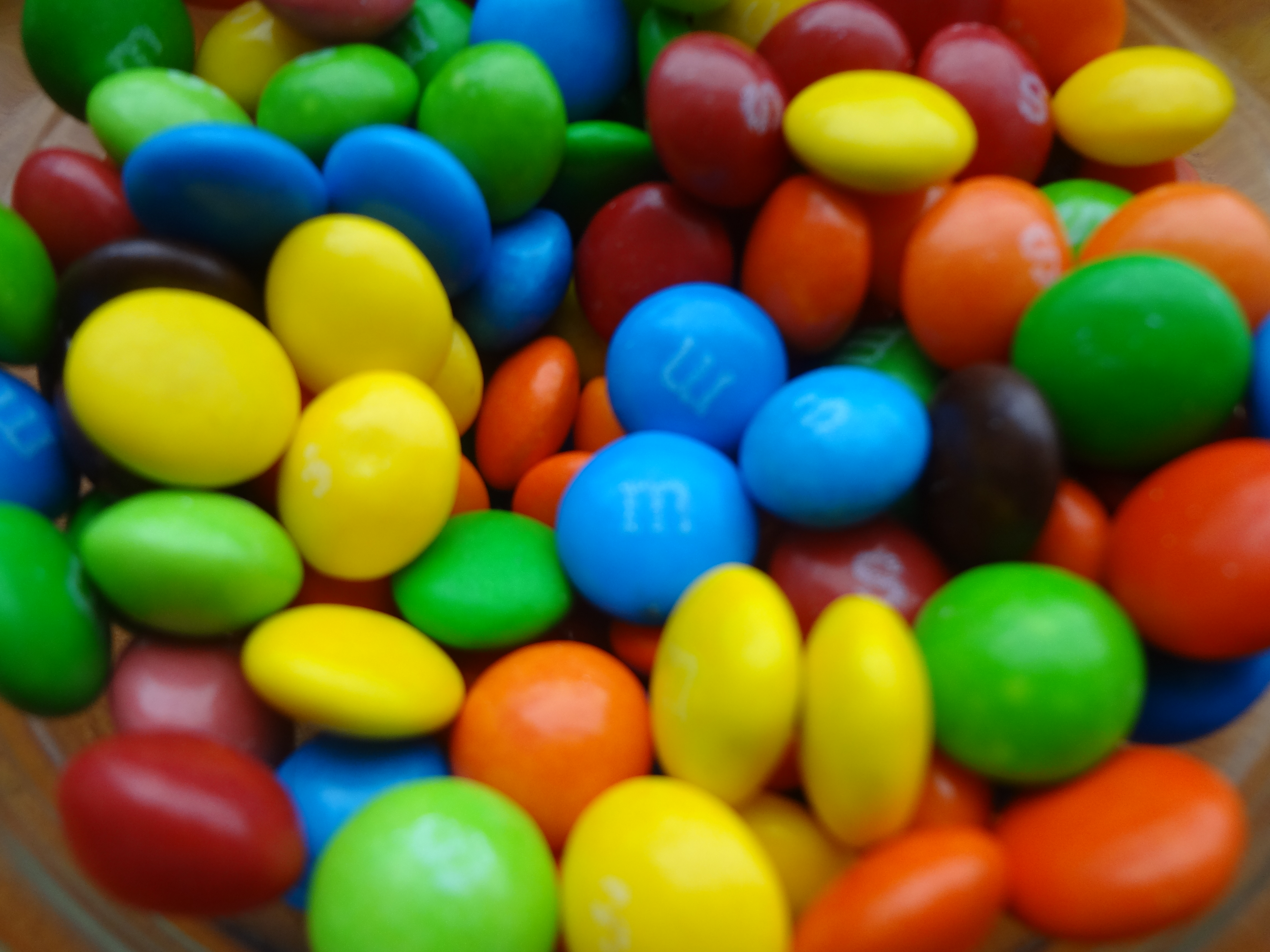
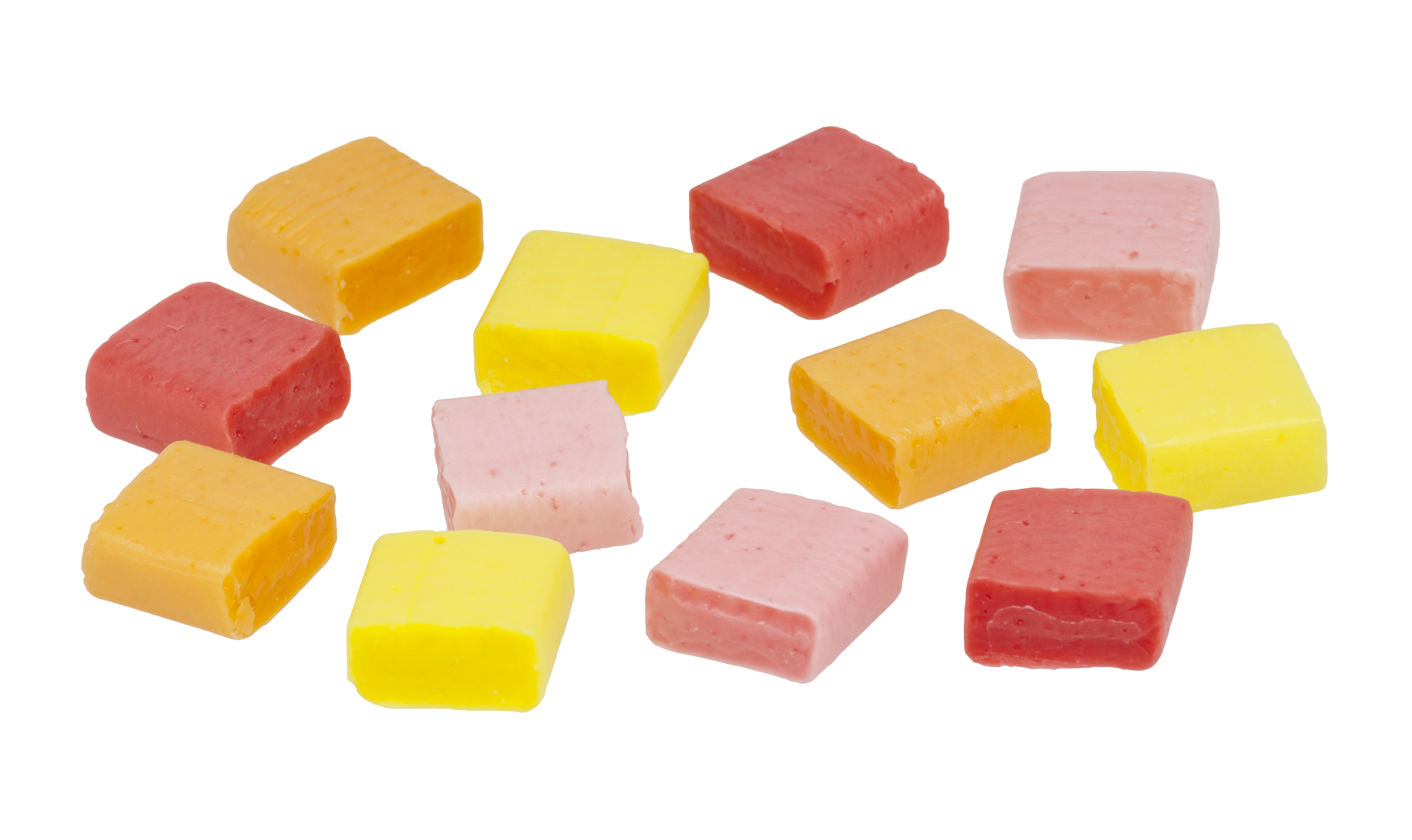
Fltr: Wrigley's Altoids, Big League Chew gums, and Skittles and Starbust candies

==== Alpine Gum ====
Alpine Gum was a gum made by Wrigley's, and was only sold in Canada. It is an alternative to cough syrup. It cools the throat and relieves sore throat pain. Alpine was discontinued in 2005.

==== Alert Gum ====
In 2013, Wrigley temporarily halted production and sales of its new Alert energy gum after the US Food and Drug Administration said it would investigate the safety of added caffeine in food products.

== See also ==
- Wrigley Building
- Wrigley Field—Chicago
- Wrigley Field—Los Angeles
- Wrigley Institute for Environmental Studies—Catalina Island
- Wrigley Rooftops
- Wrigley Square
- Wrigleyville
- Dog Breath
