= Eclipse (breath freshener) =

Brand of chewing gum and breath mints

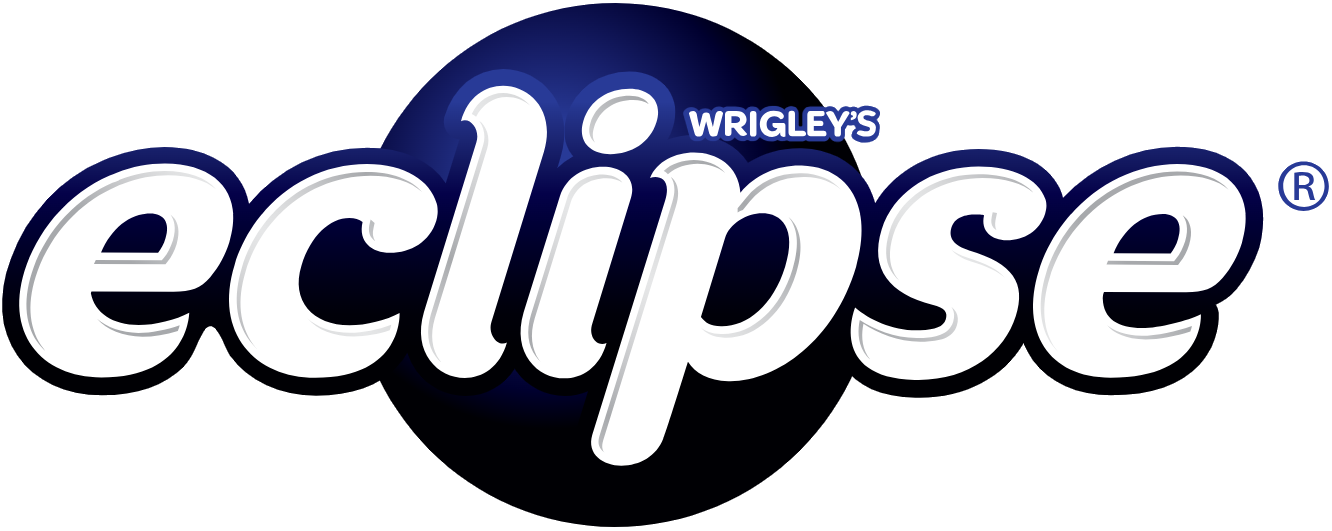

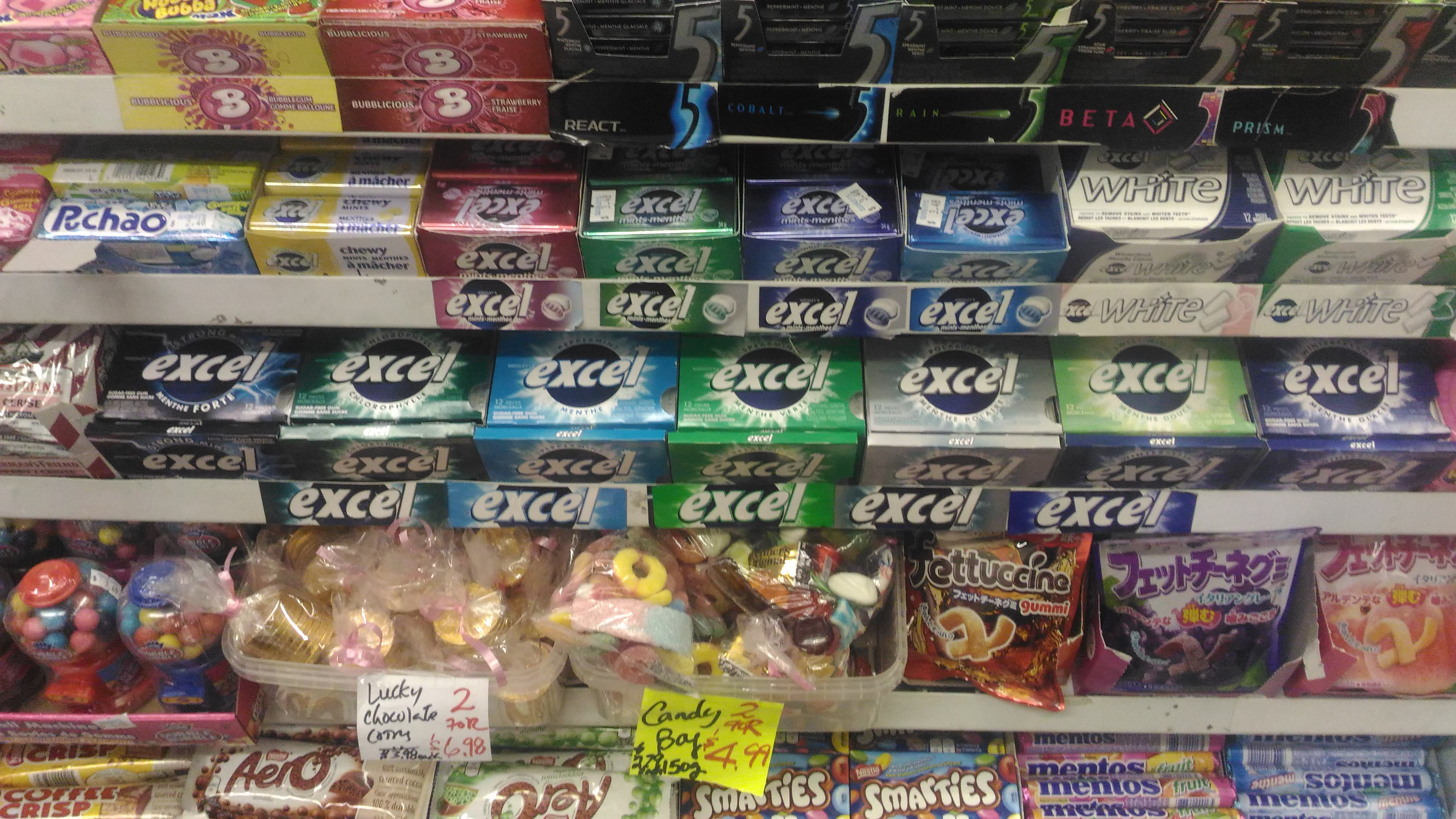
- Excel gum and mints on sale in Canada
- Product type: Chewing gum
- Current owner: Mars, Inc.
- Produced by: Wrigley Company
- Country: United States
- Introduced: 1999; 27 years ago
- Website: eclipsemints.com.au

Eclipse, or Excel in Canada, is a brand of chewing gum and breath mint, first introduced in the U.S. by the Wrigley Company in 1999 as its first entrant into the American pellet gum segment. It was modeled after "Excel" in Canada, which was launched in 1991. Today they are marketed in the US, Canada, Australia, Malaysia, South Korea, Latvia and a number of other markets around the world.

== Gum ==
Excel gum was launched in Canada in 1991, eight years before Eclipse was launched. The Eclipse brand of chewing gum was modeled after Excel and first introduced in the U.S. by the Wrigley Company in 1999. It was the company's first entrant into the U.S. pellet gum segment. It comes in blister packs of 12 pellets, split packs that include 18 pellets, and the Big-E-Pak plastic containers with 60 count plastic container of pellets.

In late 2007, the American Dental Association awarded its seal of approval to Eclipse sugarfree gum. Orbit and Extra, two other chewing gum products from the same company, also bear the ADA seal.

== Mints ==
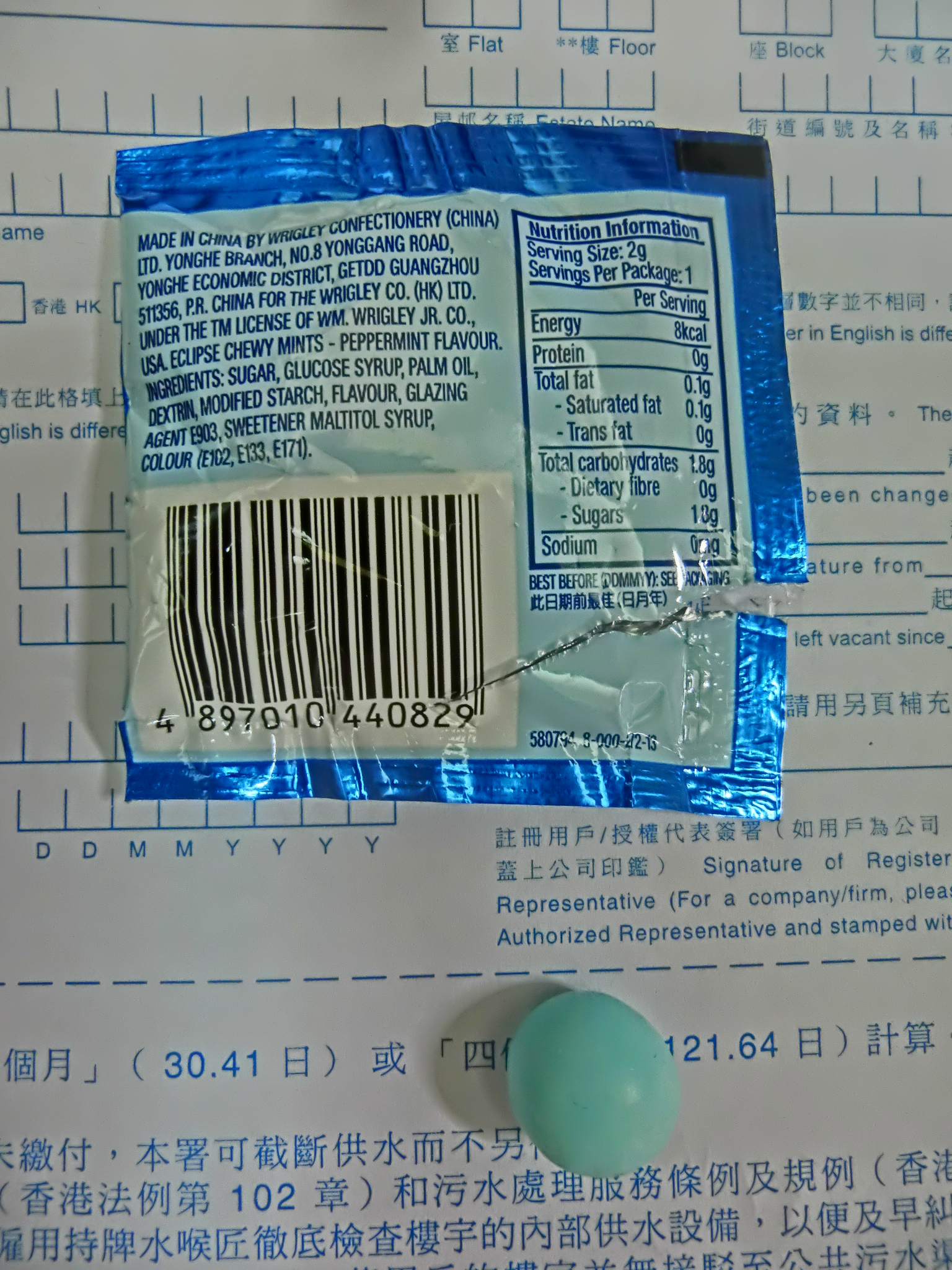
Eclipse chewy mints marketed in China

Mints, in metal and paper (Europe) containers, are also sold by Wrigley under the Eclipse brand. An Eclipse mint is an oval prism rounded at top and bottom, with the top and bottom halves varying in colour, depending on the flavor. Spearmint (green), peppermint and Black Chill (blue), and Winterfrost (dark blue) are available, as well as cinnamon (all pink), orange (light orange) and blackcurrant (purple).

The ingredients in the Australian and New Zealand cinnamon product are sorbitol, flavor, anticaking agent (470), sweeteners (955, 950) and colours (129, 133); while the orange product contains food acid (330), sweetener (951) (instead of 950), and colours (102, 129) (instead of 129, 133). The orange product advises that it contains phenylalanine.

The new packaging now claims to have a 'natural ingredient' that is scientifically proven to help kill the germs that cause bad breath. Such ingredient is not specified but the label points to a pending patent for this ingredient. Wrigley's product website for Eclipse describes the ingredient as Magnolia bark extract (MBE), which has its origins in traditional Chinese medicine. In lab tests, MBE is said to have killed almost all oral bacteria, including the types that cause bad breath and cavities. Eclipse is the first product in the US to contain MBE.

Eclipse mints are packaged in a recyclable steel box. The top of the box (narrow end) is attached with metal hinge (a true hinge, not a living hinge like many boxed mints). The top may be opened and pushed back on the hinge to gain access to the mints. On opening the box the tagline "powerful fresh breath" is revealed, printed on a raised metal plate on the inner surface of the lid.

50 mints are contained in each package, with a net weight of 1.2 oz (34 g). In Australia, the packaging was changed in March 2019 to 17 g, but the price has remained at $2 that the original packaging was at when on special at Woolworths.

=== Availability ===
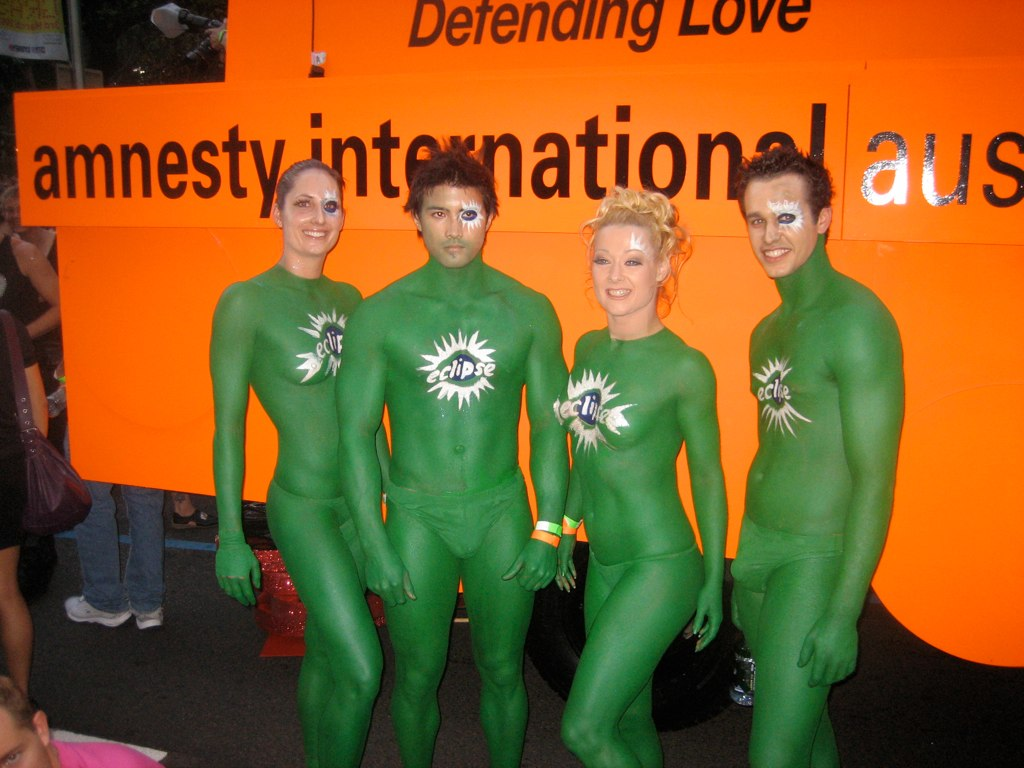
Body paint models advertising the Eclipse breath fresherers in Australia

Eclipse mints are sold in the United States, Malaysia, Australia, New Zealand, Singapore, Latvia, Taiwan, South Korea and Hong Kong under the name Eclipse mints; in Australia, they were previously sold under the name Airwaves. In Bulgaria, they are still sold as Airwaves. In Australia, Eclipse Mints was launched in 1999.

The Australian and New Zealand products contains a French translation on the outer wrapper, even though it is not an official language of either country.

The Winterfrost variety is not sold in Australia. Cinnamon has been discontinued due to very low sales, but are still available in many stores. In early 2009, the "Black Chill" variety was introduced. This variety comes in a black tin, and the mints are the same colour as the Peppermint variety. The taste is comparable to Wintergreen Tic Tacs. In late 2009 a new flavor was introduced, Cool Breeze. They are a less intense peppermint flavor and appear in a silver tin.

In Taiwan, Eclipse mints are sold with Chinese name "Yi Koh Shu" (易口舒) printed on the tin box. Two collections, Original Mint and Fruity Mint, with three flavors each are available in the market. These flavors are Spearmint, Peppermint, Winterfrost, Peach Mint, Apple Mint and Lemon Mint.

In Hong Kong, Eclipse mints are sold in tin with flavors including Spearmint (green), Peppermint (light blue), Winterfrost (blue), Orange (orange), Blackcurrant (purple), Grape (purple and green), Lime (silver and green), and peach (pink) this variation has a silver and pink box and heart-shaped mints. Eclipse sugarfree gum are sold in resealable bag with Spearmint (green), Peppermint (blue), Polar Ice (silver), and Lemon Ice (yellow) flavors.

In Canada, Excel Mints are sold with both French and English on the box, as required by law. The Canadian version only has 49 mints. During the 2010 Winter Olympics in Vancouver, Canada, each piece of gum had a small edible maple leaf printed on to support the Canadian Olympic Team. In partnership with Chinese Stomatological Association in 2012, Excel released the first dental health app in China; Ai Ya Qing Song Xue (爱牙轻松学), developed by FabriQate.

== See also ==
- List of breath mints
- List of chewing gum brands
