= Juicy Fruit =

Brand of gum by the Wrigley Company

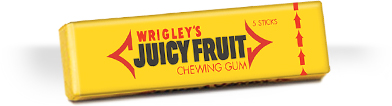
- Product type: Bubble gum
- Current owner: Mars, Inc.
- Produced by: Wrigley Company
- Country: United States
- Introduced: 1893; 133 years ago
- Website: mars.com/juicy-fruit

Juicy Fruit is an American brand of chewing gum made by the Wrigley Company, a U.S. company that since 2008 has been a subsidiary of Mars, Incorporated. It was introduced in 1893, and is the earliest of Wrigley's gum flavors still in production.

In the 21st century the brand name is recognized by 99 percent of Americans, with total sales in 2002 of 153 million units.

== History ==
When William Wrigley Jr. started his new business in Chicago, he began by selling his father's Scouring Soap, which he would entice customers to purchase by adding a gift of baking powder. The baking powder offered ended up being far more popular than the Scouring Soap, so he switched to selling the baking powder instead. In 1892, Wrigley Jr. decided to give his baking powder customers a gift, this time, attaching a few sticks of chewing gum to the box of baking powder. Wrigley's first gums were called Lotta and Vassar.

The chewing gum was far more popular than the baking powder, so Wrigley Jr. again switched his business this time to chewing gum. In 1893, Wrigley Jr. introduced a new flavor of gum, Juicy Fruit, which helped the Wrigley Company to become the most popular and successful chewing gum company in the world.

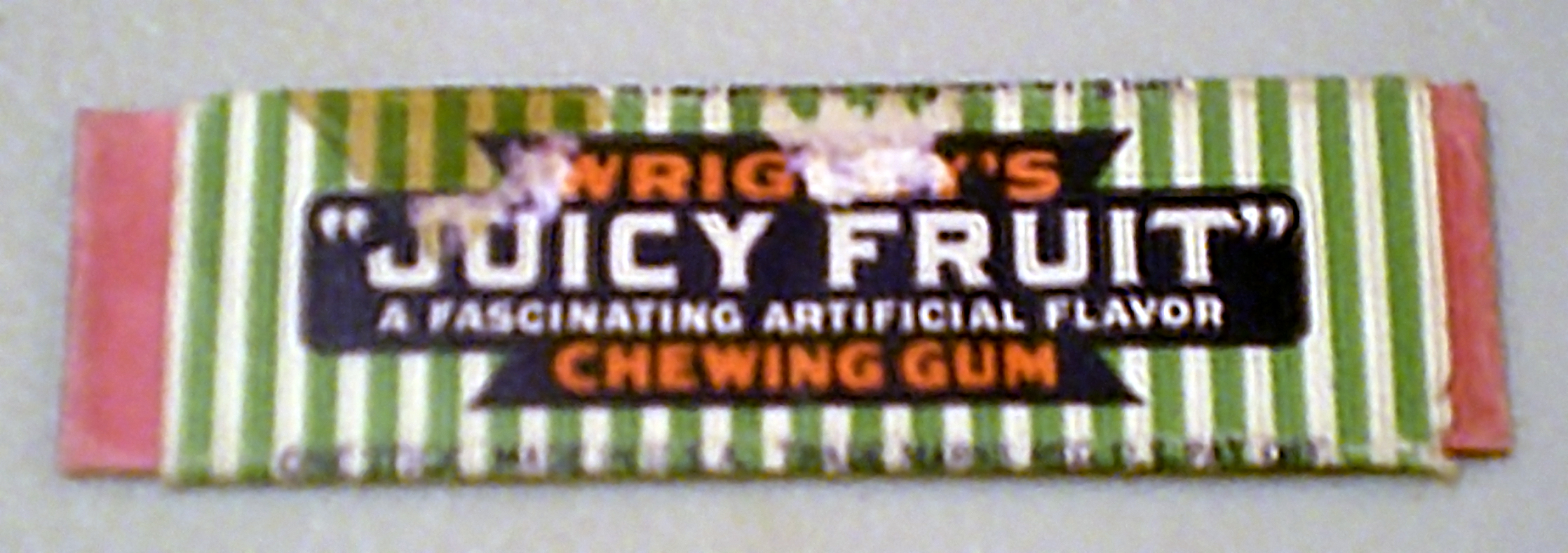
A Juicy Fruit wrapper from 1946, described on the package as a "fascinating artificial flavor".

When the brand first entered the market, it was packaged simply, with a plain wrapper and "JUICY FRUIT" in red, thin block letters. In 1914, Wrigley changed it to thin vertical white and green stripes with "Wrigley's Juicy Fruit Chewing Gum" centered in a stylized Maltese Cross emblem with a black background.

Juicy Fruit was taken off of the civilian market temporarily during World War II because of ingredient shortages and the demand for the gum to be included in C-rations. When the gum was reintroduced to the general public after World War II ended, the striped packaging was replaced by one with a bright yellow background and "Juicy Fruit" bracketed between two stylized chevrons, the latter a motif meant to echo the "Wrigley arrow" element used for Wrigley's Spearmint since 1893.

The bright yellow background remained into the 21st century, with variations since 2002 turning the arrowhead like chevrons into the corners of an elongated smile under the brand name. Juicy Fruit is still widely popular today.

In 2003 in the United States, Wrigley's replaced some of the sugar in Juicy Fruit with two artificial sweeteners, aspartame and Acesulfame potassium.

"Grapefruit—Juicy Fruit" is a song written and performed by singer-songwriter Jimmy Buffett. It was first released on his 1973 album A White Sport Coat and a Pink Crustacean and was his third single from that album. The single reached #23 on the Billboard Easy Listening chart in September 1973.

It also features in the 1983 song "Juicy Fruit" by Mtume. Separately, a Juicy Fruit jingle that ended with the lyrics—"the taste, the taste, the taste is gonna move ya!"—was widely recognizable in TV advertisements throughout the 1980s.

Alongside other famous flavors like Wrigley's Spearmint, Juicy Fruit was discontinued in Germany and Austria in 2022.

== Description ==
=== Flavor ===
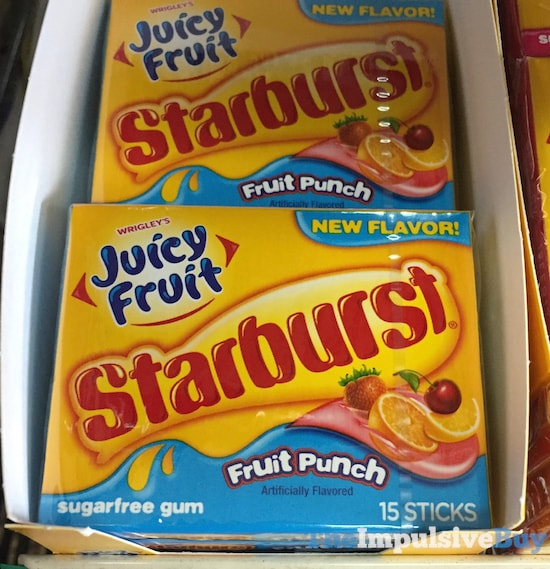
Along with the standard flavor, they have also collaborated with Starburst to release Fruit Punch, Cherry, Orange, Grapefruit and Watermelon flavors

Which fruit serves as the model for its flavor is kept vague in advertising, though in 2003, advertising agency BBDO characterized it as a combination of banana and pineapple, and some people say it resembles jackfruit. According to two books in the Imponderables series, peach is one crucial flavor among many others.

=== Consumer demographics ===
The average age of the typical Juicy Fruit consumer is under 20, mostly three- to eleven-year-olds; those twenty years old and over account for 40% of the purchases.

Sean Payton, head coach of the Denver Broncos and former head coach of the New Orleans Saints of the NFL, is well known for requesting Juicy Fruit in the middle of games.

=== Ingredients ===
Juicy Fruit gum consists mostly of sugar contained in a synthetic gum base. Other ingredients include corn syrup and dextrose as bulk agents and natural sweeteners, natural and artificial flavorings, glycerol and lecithin as softening agents, aspartame (NutraSweet) and acesulfame K as artificial sweeteners, Yellow Lake 5 as a coloring and BHT as a preservative.
