= Extra (gum) =

Brand of chewing gum

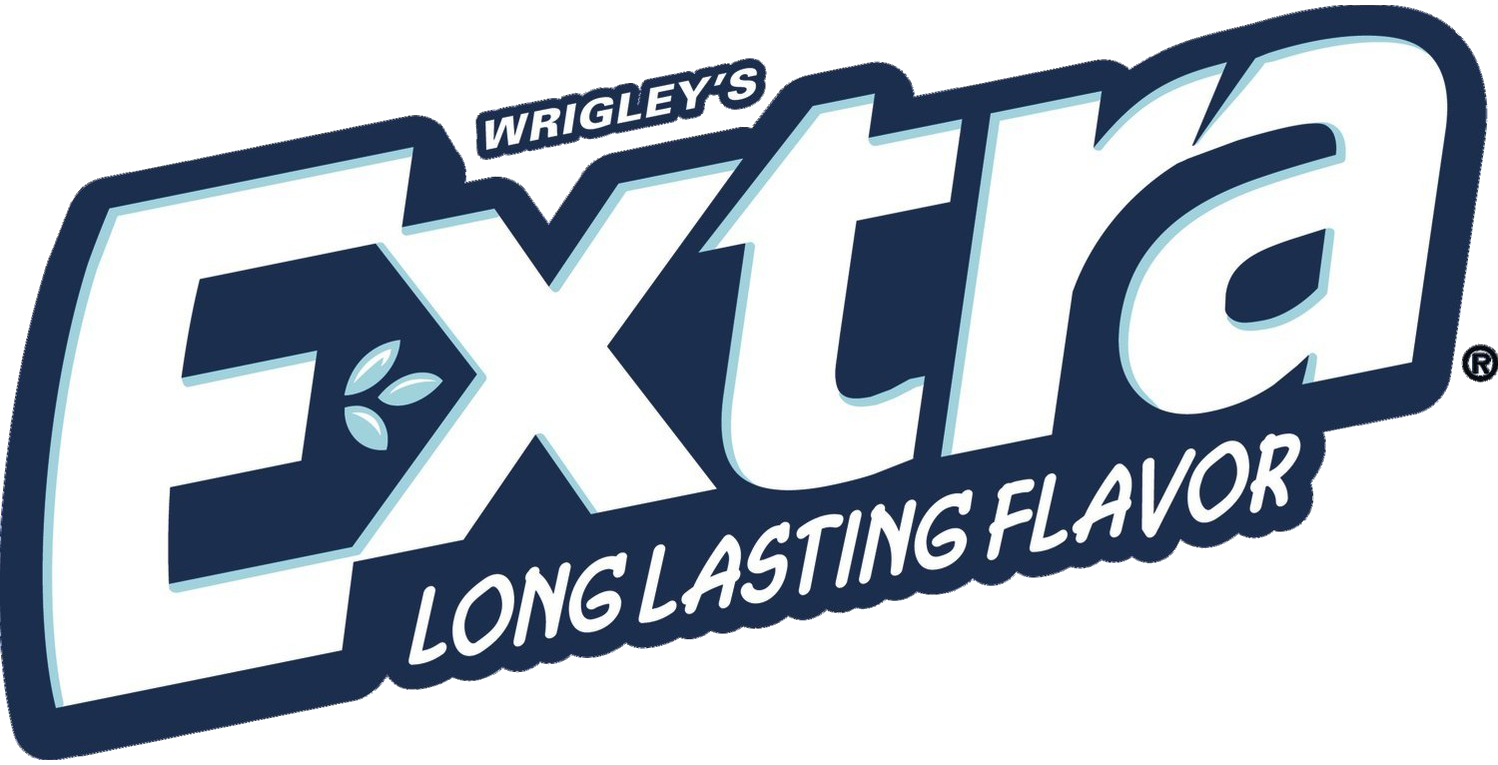
- Extra logo in US

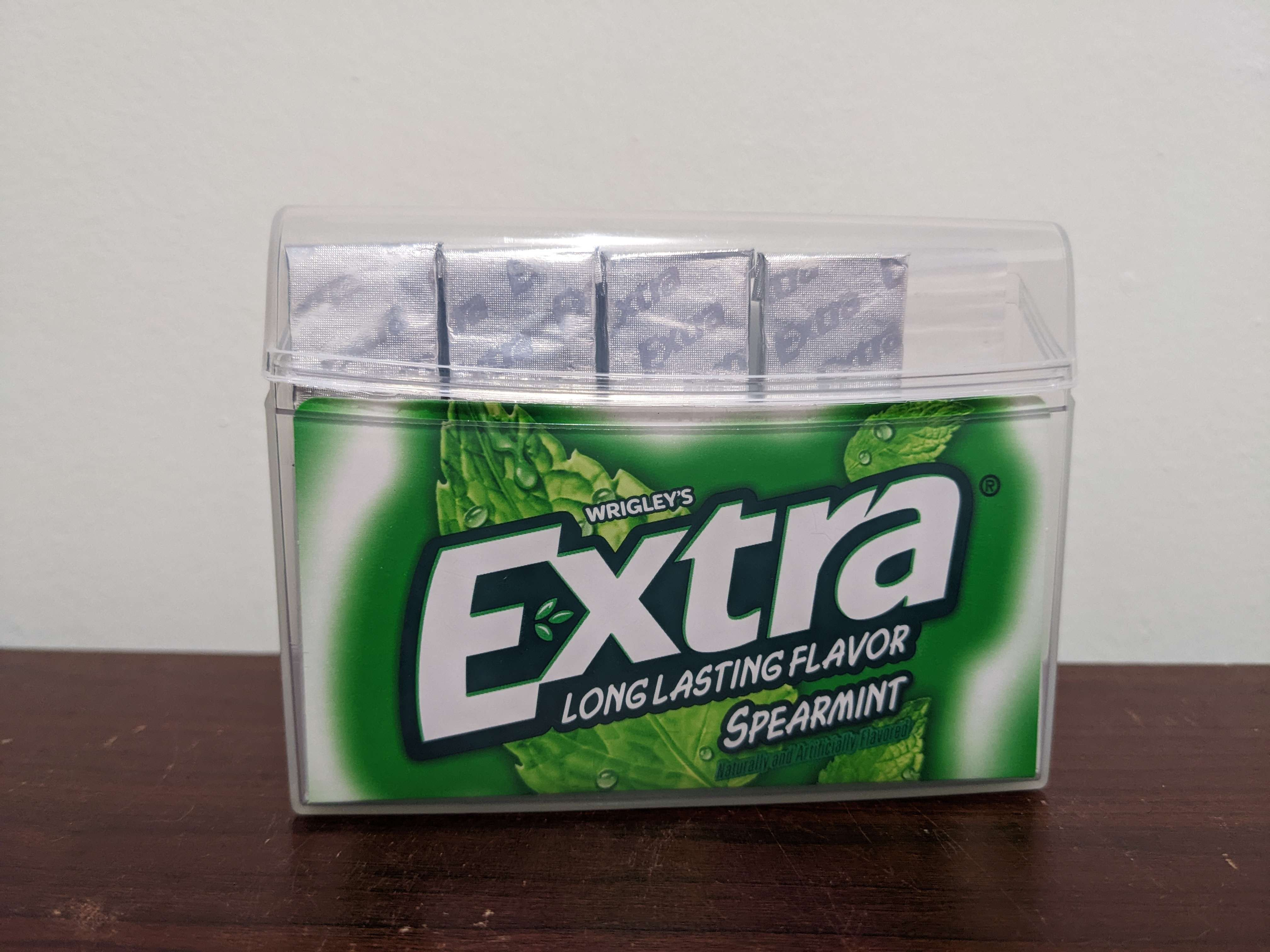
- Pack of Extra marketed in the United States
- Product type: Chewing gum
- Current owner: Mars, Inc.
- Produced by: Wrigley Company
- Country: United States
- Introduced: 1984; 42 years ago
- Website: extragum.com

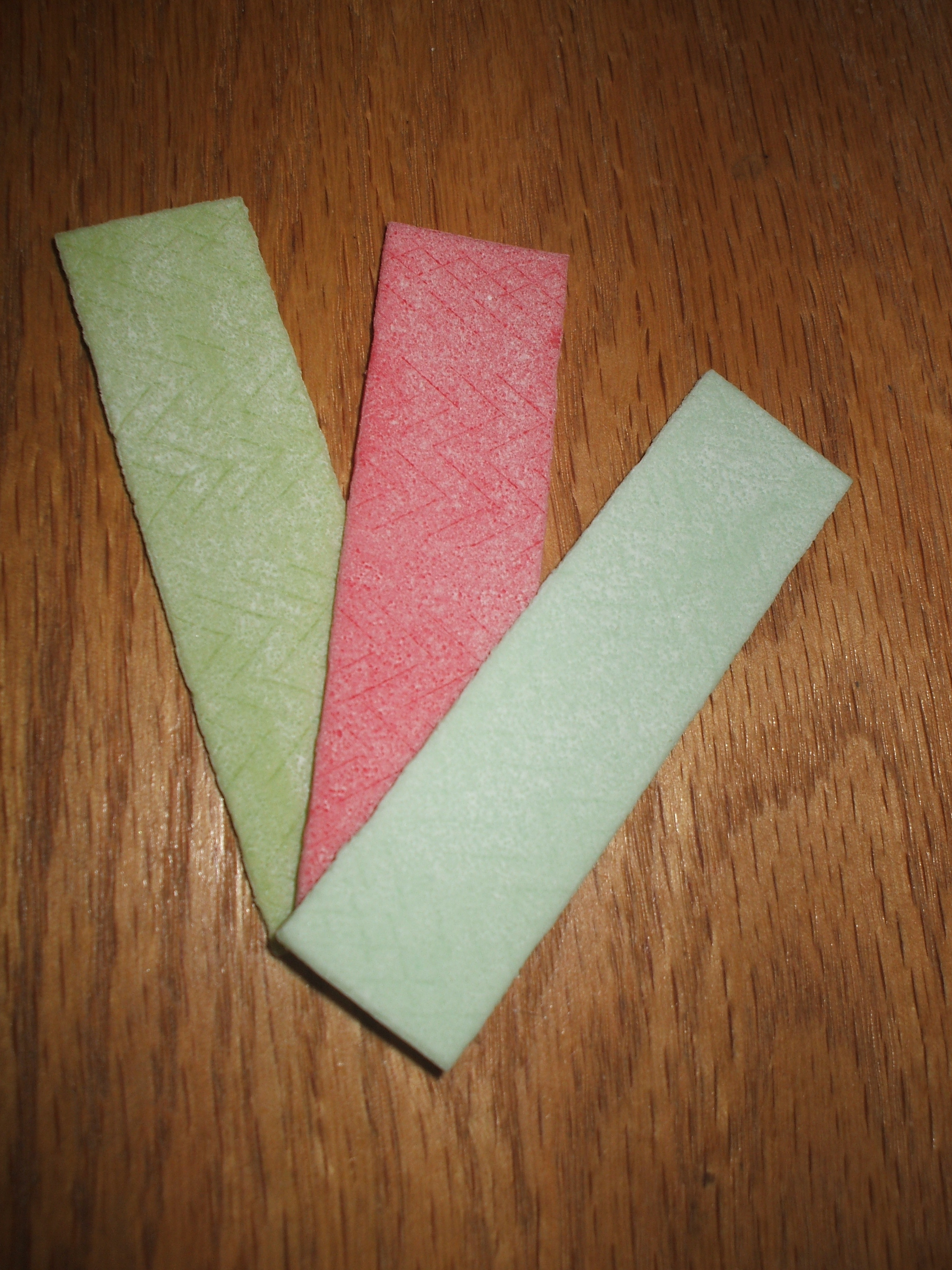
Extra Dessert Delights sticks

Extra is a brand of sugarfree chewing gum produced by the Wrigley Company in several markets in the world with different variations.

An American piece of Extra gum is approximately 2.5 gram in weight and has 2 grams of sugar alcohol. This compares to a 1.9 gram in weight and 1 gram sugar alcohol value in an American piece of Orbit gum.

== History ==
Extra was launched in 1984 to U.S. markets and became one of the most popular brands of chewing gum within five years. It was also the first sugarfree gum not to use saccharin, instead using the NutraSweet brand (aspartame), a sweetener developed by G.D. Searle & Co. that had less bitterness and was believed to be safer in humans and laboratory animals.

As of 2001, Extra has been marketed in the U.S., Canada, Germany, China, Hong Kong, Taiwan, Australia, and New Zealand. It has also been marketed in Great Britain since 1990.

Extra became the sponsor of the Mexico national football team in 2011.
