= Timeline of the 2007 pet food recalls =

This timeline of the 2007 pet food recalls documents how events related to the 2007 pet food recalls unfolded. Several contaminated Chinese vegetable proteins were used by pet food makers in North America, Europe and South Africa, leading to kidney failure in animals fed the contaminated food. Both the centralization of the pet food industry and the speed and manner of the industry and government response became the subjects of critical discussion.

== Contaminated goods are imported ==
=== November 6, 2006 ===
Tainted wheat gluten in bags from Xuzhou Anying Biologic Technology Development Company in China is imported to the United States by Las Vegas-based ChemNutra, Inc. from a Chinese textile company.

=== November 2006 ===
Canada-based company Menu Foods begins to use the tainted wheat gluten at its plants in the U.S. states of Kansas and New Jersey.

== Early reports of pet deaths ==
=== December 2006 ===
Unconfirmed reports indicate that Menu Foods receives word of a possible problem with some of its products as early as December 2006.

=== February 20, 2007 ===
Menu Foods acknowledges receiving the first complaints of sick pets on February 20.

=== February 26, 2007 ===
The chief financial officer of Menu Foods, Mark Wiens, sells roughly half of his Menu Foods stock on February 26 and 27. He has referred to the timing as a "horrible coincidence."

=== February 27, 2007 ===
Menu Foods begins internal taste testing of its food. The company conducts taste testing of its products quarterly, and the February testing was not a result of the received complaints.

=== March 2, 2007 ===
The company begins to investigate a possible problem when as many as 1 in 6 pets began to die after consuming products containing wheat gluten.

=== Mid-march, 2007 ===
Cornell University and a New York state-based testing facility receive samples from Menu Foods for testing.

== The initial recall ==
=== March 16, 2007 ===
On March 16, Menu Foods issues a U.S. nationwide recall for dog and cat foods produced at two of its facilities between December 3, 2006, and March 6, 2007. The initial recall comprises sixty million units of cuts and gravy-style food in pouches sold under nearly 100 brand names, including premium brands like Iams and private-label brands sold at nationwide chains such as Wal-Mart, Kroger, and other large retailers. While the recalled products represent just 1% of pet foods available in the U.S., the recall is one of the largest in American history.

=== March 21, 2007 ===
Menu Foods confirms the problem was with the wheat gluten used to thicken and enrich the gravy in the canned and pouched wet food products, and that the medical problems exhibited in test subjects include kidney failure. At the time it is unknown why the kidney failure occurs.

=== Late March, 2007 ===
Following the first word of a recall, reports of pet sicknesses and deaths began to come in from throughout the United States and Canada. Although Menu Foods products are also sold in Mexico, little information is published regarding the situation in that country.

Some independent sources, such as petconnection.com, begin collecting several hundred reports of animal deaths per day.

== "Rat poison" alleged to be contaminant ==
=== March 23, 2007 ===
The New York State Food Laboratory reported that aminopterin was found in samples sent to them by Cornell. Aminopterin is widely described in news reports as a "rat poison" though that assertion may be based upon a hypothetical use listed in the 1951 patent application and not upon the actual use of the chemical.

== The recall expands ==
=== March 24, 2007 ===
Menu Foods expands the recall to include dozens of more cat and dog food products, including all varieties of 'cuts and gravy' type wet pet food in cans and pouches, not just specific UPCs, as before, in order to ensure pet stores removed any chance of contaminated batches reaching consumers.

== Wheat gluten contaminated with melamine ==
=== March 27, 2007 ===
The American Society for the Prevention of Cruelty to Animals first reports that symptoms described in affected animals are not "fully consistent with the ingestion of rat poison containing aminopterin."

=== March 30, 2007 ===
The U.S. Food and Drug Administration (FDA) announces a possible source of the sicknesses, indicated by the presence of melamine, an industrial chemical, in wheat gluten imported from China. The FDA prohibits the import of wheat gluten from a specific Chinese company, Xuzhou Anying Biologic Technology Development Company (徐州安营生物技术开发有限公司),^{website}, and says that the contamination may be in dry pet foods as well.

Late that Friday, Hill's Pet Nutrition, Inc., Del Monte, and Nestlé Purina recall several brands of wet and dry pet foods.

=== April 3, 2007 ===
Concerns are first voiced in the news media that the imported gluten may have been used in products intended for human consumption, however the United States Food and Drug Administration (FDA) assures consumers that all of the suspect gluten was used exclusively in pet foods and there is "no evidence to suggest that any of the imported Wheat Gluten from the suspect firm has entered the human food supply."

=== April 4, 2007 ===
The contaminated wheat gluten is determined to have come directly from China or through the Netherlands to the U.S. through ChemNutra, a Las Vegas-based supply company for pet food manufacturers. ChemNutra orders a recall of all of the suspected wheat gluten batches.

The Chinese government refuses FDA requests to inspect facilities suspected of producing contaminated products.

=== April 5, 2007 ===
The Chinese government categorically denies any connection to the North American food poisonings to the New York Times, claiming they had no record of exporting any agricultural products that could have tainted the recalled pet foods, including the wheat gluten that has been the focus of the investigation. The general manager of the Xuzhou Anying Biologic Technology Development Company also denied that they had exported any wheat gluten to North America.

=== April 6, 2007 ===
The Chinese government tells the Associated Press that they will investigate the source of the wheat gluten. The Xinhua News Agency states that "sampling and examination" of wheat gluten was underway across China, centering on the presence of melamine.

== Further recalls and possibly thousands of animals dead ==
=== April 9, 2007 ===
News breaks that scientists at a University of California, Davis animal health laboratory confirmed that a "popular brand of pet food" submitted for testing by area veterinarians was contaminated with melamine, even though it is not on the list of recalled cat and dog foods.

=== April 10, 2007 ===
On April 10, Menu Foods announces that the recall will be expanded to include foods manufactured at Menu Foods' plant in Streetsville, Ontario. Menu Foods officials had believed that the plant did not have the same problems as their New Jersey and Kansas plants, but tests revealed that contaminated wheat gluten had made it into Canada.

By April 10 Menu Foods had only confirmed 16 deaths outside of its test subjects, comprising 15 cats and one dog. This number is frequently cited in news reports as there is no equivalent of the Centers for Disease Control to verify the cause of other reported pet deaths.

=== April 11, 2007 ===
One self-reported on-line data base reaches more than 3600 deaths allegedly connected to the recall. The FDA acknowledges receiving more than 15,000 complaints from consumers related to the recall, but will not comment on the possible number of pet sicknesses or deaths.

The same day, a distributor of agricultural and industrial products, Wilbur-Ellis Company, discovers a single pink, one-ton bag labeled "melamine" among 145 other white bags of imported rice protein concentrate from Binzhou Futian Biology Technology in China. Wilbur-Ellis immediately quarantines the shipment.

By April 11 there are more than 130 brands of dog and cat foods from five companies recalled. Most of the foods are wet, though there are some dry foods and dog biscuits as part of the recall as a precautionary measure even though no cases of poisoning from dry foods have yet been reported.

== Senate hearings ==
=== April 12, 2007 ===
Hearings are held by United States Senator Richard Durbin in front of the United States Senate Appropriations Subcommittee on Agriculture, Rural Development, Food and Drug Administration, and Related Agencies. FDA officials admit that contaminated food was likely still on store shelves throughout the country, and urge consumers to re-check the food they have in their possession.

Also on the 12th, Menu Foods admits that a "clerical error" allowed more tainted product to be released to the public after the recall had begun.

== Recalls in South Africa ==
Royal Canin dog food was recalled in South Africa on April 12 after 19 dogs were confirmed to be suffering "acute renal failure" related to eating recalled dog food. That week Hill's Pet Nutrition also recalled a batch of food for diabetic cats in South Africa.

== A second contaminated food source ==
=== April 15, 2007 ===
Wilbur-Ellis notifies the FDA that it had found a bag labelled melamine mixed in with a shipment of rice protein concentrate.

=== April 17, 2007 ===
On April 17 a product not containing wheat-gluten is recalled due to the presence of melamine in pet food. Natural Balance Pet Foods has found melamine in two products containing rice protein from a then-unnamed supplier (Wilbur-Ellis). Eleven dogs and "three or four" cats are reported as known to be suffering kidney problems as a result of eating the food.

=== April 18, 2007 ===
The contaminated rice protein is publicly identified as having come from Wilbur-Ellis, who had by then distributed the contaminated protein to five different pet food manufacturers in Utah, New York, Kansas and Missouri. Since pet food recalls are voluntary, the FDA refuses to name the companies involved.

== Additional contaminants ==
=== April 19, 2007 ===
On April 19, 2007, researchers announce that they have identified three additional chemicals in the melamine-contaminated rice protein and animals that had consumed it. The chemicals include cyanuric acid, a chemical used in chlorinated pools. All three chemicals are derivatives of melamine.

The same day, Royal Canin issues recalls of eight varieties of their pet foods.

Also on April 19, U.S. federal officials said that they were investigating reports that Binzhou Futian rice protein had been used in hog feed, but declined to specify where. The California Department of Food and Agriculture placed American Hog Farm in Ceres, California, under quarantine, after melamine was found in the urine of the hogs on the farm. California State Veterinarian Dr. Richard Breitmeyer said "All animals appear healthy," and that "It is unknown if the chemical will be detected in meat." American Hog Farm primarily supplies whole hogs to individuals. Anyone who has purchased a pig from American Hog Farm since April 3 is advised not to eat it.

=== April 20, 2007 ===
The South African pet food industry announced that they would no longer import gluten products from China after the presence of melamine was confirmed in Chinese corn gluten. At least 30 dogs have died of kidney failure related to contaminated food in South Africa.

== More recalls ==
Also on the 20th, pet food company SmartPak issued a late night recall of two dog food products related to contaminated rice protein. SmartPak was one of the two remaining companies supplied by Wilbur-Ellis, leaving only one company refusing to recall its contaminated products.

=== April 23, 2007 ===
China finally gave permission to FDA investigators to enter the country.

== The human food supply ==
=== April 24, 2007 ===
The FDA announces that melamine has been found in the urine of hogs in North Carolina, California and South Carolina, that farms in Utah, New York and possibly Ohio had received contaminated feed. They had not yet determined if, beyond a small amount in California, any contaminated meat had reached the human food supply. The FDA also announces that it was now testing six common food ingredients – wheat gluten, corn gluten, cornmeal, soy protein, rice bran and rice protein concentrate – as a precaution.

At least one plaintiff in a lawsuit against Menu Foods first receives a call from someone on behalf of Menu Foods who would not initially identify herself. She would not provide a last name, a return telephone number or information on how she got the plaintiff's number. Eventually the caller acknowledged she was from Menu Food's insurance adjustor, Crawford & Company. This call is followed a few days later by a second caller who, when told it was illegal for the plaintiffs to be contacted directly by representatives of the defendant, allegedly responded "So you don't want a settlement package?"

=== April 25, 2007 ===
FDA Officials traced the melamine responsible for pet deaths to two Chinese plants, which have been supplying American distributors since last summer. On that same day, Chinese authorities shut down Binzhou Futian Biology Technology Co. Ltd., and detained the manager, Tian Feng. Feng denies responsibility, saying that he "didn't do anything wrong," and denying that he even knows what melamine is.

== More recalls ==
=== April 26, 2007 ===
On April 26, the FDA announced that over 6,000 hogs had been quarantined on farms in California, New York, South Carolina, North Carolina, Utah, Kansas, Oklahoma and Ohio. Additionally, the U.S. Department of Agriculture announced that the meat of 345 hogs that had eaten contaminated feed had entered the U.S. food supply, possibly via slaughterhouses in Kansas and Utah.

Also on Monday, April 26, seven recalls were either expanded or issued for the first time.

The final Wilbur-Ellis-related recall was issued by Chenango Valley Pet Foods, nine days after Wilbur-Ellis had announced its rice protein was contaminated with melamine.

That day, Diamond Pet Foods also issued an expanded recall and Costco's Kirkland Signature brand issued a new recall.

Blue Buffalo also expands its recall, Harmony Farms announces a recall, and American Nutrition, Inc. (ANI) issues a voluntary recall of 28 different pet food products that they manufacture which are sold under other labels. ANI states that pet foods that they manufacture under their own label are not affected by the current recall.

Finally, China's Foreign Ministry says that it has banned the use of melamine in food products, admitting that products containing melamine had cleared customs while continuing to dispute the role of melamine in causing pet deaths. China also vowed to cooperate with U.S. investigators to find the "real cause" of pet deaths.

=== April 27, 2007 ===
Natural Balance Inc. issues another voluntary recall, recalling three of their varieties of dog food and one variety of cat food, and Canine Caviar issued a voluntary recall of 3 varieties of pet food.

The April 26 and April 27 recalls by Blue Buffalo, Canine Caviar, Diamond, Harmony Farms, and Natural Balance are claimed by all five brands to be due to unauthorized inclusion of rice protein by American Nutrition, Inc. (ANI), their manufacturer. This adds a new potential source of contamination and distrust, namely non-compliant contract manufacturers, beyond the original problematic Chinese ingredient suppliers. Diamond and Natural Balance refer to this as a "manufacturing deviation" by ANI. Blue Buffalo and Harmony Farms characterize this as "product tampering" by ANI. Blue Buffalo has announced plans to change manufacturers while Canine Caviar and Natural Balance both announced that they will avoid future problems due to incorrect manufacturing by demanding more paperwork from their manufacturers. ANI has issued a press release denying any deliberate or intentionally wrongful conduct.

The FDA announces that of 750 samples of wheat gluten and products containing wheat gluten that 330 had tested positive for melamine contamination. Out of 85 samples of rice protein concentrate and products made with it, 27 were contaminated.

== Humans eat animals fed contaminated food ==
=== April 28, 2007 ===
The Chicago Tribune reports that, according to California state officials, approximately 45 state residents consumed pork from hogs that had been fed melamine-contaminated feed.

=== April 30, 2007 ===
The FDA and the United States Department of Agriculture (USDA) issue a joint press release stating that contaminated feed was used at approximately 38 chicken farms in Indiana in early February and that and all fed broiler chickens have been processed. They state that the likelihood of human illness is very low.

=== May 1, 2007 ===
The FDA and USDA acknowledge that millions of chickens fed contaminated feed had been eaten.

=== May 2, 2007 ===
Menu Foods recalls additional pet food items made at the same plant as prior recalled items due to suspected cross-contamination.

=== May 3, 2007 ===
Chinese authorities detained Mao Lijun, general manager of the Xuzhou Anying Biologic Technology Development, on unspecified charges.

The same day, SmartPak Canine executed a voluntary nationwide recall on two products that tested positive for melamine.

Dr. David Acheson, assistant FDA commissioner for food protection, states that the FDA has begun to investigate domestic food manufacturers who use protein products to ensure that no contaminated product is being used in foods intended for human use, noting that it has no evidence of this occurring, "but it's prudent to look."

=== May 7, 2007 ===
The USDA releases some swine and poultry from farms suspected of having received contaminated feed for processing based on no melamine being detected in feed samples using approved tests. No mention is made whether USDA conducted tests for melamine in animal tissue of animals released for processing A USDA spokesman was reported as saying 20 million chickens were included in this category of animals released for processing.

United States food safety officials issue joint risk assessment of very low risk to humans from eating pork or poultry from animals known to have consumed feed tainted with contaminated pet food scraps based on criteria predating current research on toxicity of melamine and cyanuric acid in combination."

=== May 8, 2007 ===
Adulteration of animal feed with cyanuric acid in China is reported.

It is also announced that melamine discovered in fish feed at hatcheriers that raise fish for human consumption.

=== May 9, 2007 ===
Officials from the USDA and FDA testify in front of the United States House of Representatives Committee on Agriculture.

=== May 11, 2007 ===
Royal Canin issues an additional voluntary recall, recalling seventeen of their varieties in addition to those recalled on April 18 (at which time they stated that 'Effective immediately, Royal Canin USA does not source any of its vegetable proteins-including rice gluten-from China')

=== May 14, 2007 ===
Royal Canin announces an expansion of its existing recalls.

=== May 15, 2007 ===
56,000 swine are cleared for processing without being tested for cyanuric acid after a revised risk assessment by the USDA and FDA still concluded that there is "very low" risk to humans from eating the contaminated meat.

=== May 17, 2007 ===
Chenango Valley Pet Foods expands its recall to foods that do not explicitly contain wheat gluten or rice protein, citing cross-contamination with those ingredients in the manufacturating process. For the first time, a non-cat or dog pet food is recalled since the list includes ferret food.

=== May 18, 2007 ===
Researchers at the USDA Bee Research Laboratory and the FDA Center for Veterinary Medicine begin investigating bee feed for the presence of melamine-related compounds as a possible cause of Colony Collapse Disorder – the unprecedented die-off of a quarter of the honeybees in the United States during 2006 that endangers the human food supply. Commercial bee feeds are protein-based, containing soy and yeast ingredients; however, no link has been found so far.

In U.S. District Court, Judge Noel Hillman cautions Menu Foods and their insurance adjustor, Crawford & Co., to avoid contacting pet owners who had joined any of the lawsuits against Menu Foods because, legally, Menu can only contact plaintiffs through their lawyers.

=== May 20, 2007 ===
Menu Foods and Chenango Valley Pet Foods both announce that they are phasing out Chinese ingredients until they can be assured that they are safe. Other pet food manufacturers, including Nestlé Purina Petcare have started screening for melamine.

=== May 21, 2007 ===
After four dogs suffering kidney problems are brought to the same clinic in Visalia, California, they are found to have all eaten Nutra Nuggets brand food – a food not on the recall list. Melamine contamination is confirmed after a sample was sent to a laboratory at University of California at Davis.

== Human food tests positive for melamine ==
=== May 22, 2007 ===
United States Department of Health and Human Services (DHHS) officials announce that melamine was detected in catfish imported to Arkansas from Asia for human food. The fish were being investigated for antibiotics, which were not found. The DHHS stated that the levels detected did not pose a human health hazard.

=== May 23, 2007 ===
Diamond Pet Foods recalls bags of Nutra Nuggets Lamb Meal and Rice formula dry dog food after they are found to be contaminated with melamine that Diamond attributes to cross contamination in the manufacturing process.

U.S. District Court Judge Noel Hillman orders Menu Foods to have no contact with plaintiffs unless their attorneys are involved in the discussion after lawyers from six firms representing pet owners claim that the company was directly contacting their clients. Hillman states that "It seems to me that Menu Food is out to do whatever Menu Foods wants to do in a way that could adversely impact the rights" of the plaintiffs.

=== May 25, 2007 ===
Corn gluten from China tests positive for melamine and cyanuric acid and is intercepted by Canadian authorities.

=== May 29, 2007 ===
Zheng Xiaoyu, the head of the Chinese State Food and Drug Administration from its founding in 1998 until 2005 receives the death sentence for corruption. Zheng was convicted of taking bribes worth $844,000 – significantly less than the bribes taken by officials given lesser penalties in China. Dozens of Chinese died due to the approval of untested medicines and falsely labeled food during Zheng's tenure.

China also announces the creation of its first recall system for unsafe food products.

== Melamine used by U.S. manufacturer as food binder ==
=== May 30, 2007 ===
The FDA issues a press release stating that two US-based animal feed manufacturers had been adulterating livestock feed and fish/shrimp feed with melamine. Tembec BTLSR Inc. of Toledo, Ohio, manufactures feed ingredients AquaBond and Aqua-Tec II, adding melamine to improve the binding properties of pelleted food.

=== May 31, 2007 ===
Zeigler Bros., Inc. issues a voluntary recall of its shrimp feeds products that contain AquaBond.

=== June 5, 2007 ===
Sergeant's Pet Care Products voluntarily recalled some production lots of Atlantis Goldfish Flake Food and Atlantis Tropical Fish Flake Food due to melamine being found in these specific products (approximately 20–80 parts per million). The fish food that is being recalled is for pet/ornamental fish and not used to feed fish intended for human consumption.

== Acetaminophen investigated ==
=== June 6, 2007 ===
The FDA launches and investigation after acetaminophen, best known under the brand-name Tylenol, is identified by ExperTox Inc., a laboratory in Texas, as a fifth contaminant present in many varieties of pet food. A single 500 mg tablet of acetaminophen is sufficient to kill an adult cat. The FDA does not identify which brands might be affected, however on June 13 website ConsumerAffairs.com reports that two of the samples were Pet Pride "Turkey and Giblets Dinner" and "Mixed Grill", both manufactured by Menu Foods.

=== June 7, 2007 ===
The FDA announces that melamine-contaminated shrimp feed and feed ingredients made in the United States may have been exported by Zeigler Bros. Inc. to thirteen countries – Panama, Venezuela, Belize, Suriname, Costa Rica, Honduras, Ecuador, Brazil, the Dominican Republic, Jamaica, Gambia, Lebanon and Canada. It is unclear whether the exported products actually reached their destinations or entered markets there.

China announces that three shipments of raisins and health supplements from the United States were blocked because they "failed to meet the sanitary standards of China" after levels of bacteria and sulphur dioxide were found to be too high. The shipments were either destroyed or sent back. In April 2007 alone, the United States had rejected 257 food shipments from China.

=== June 11, 2007 ===
Menu Foods announces that a "significant customer" – later identified as Procter & Gamble – has decided to end its contract for cuts-and-gravy products. The contract accounted for 11% of Menu Food's 2006 sales. Procter & Gamble continues to purchase solid canned food from Menu.

=== June 12, 2007 ===
The FDA announces that acetaminophen has not been found in five samples of cat food and two samples of dog food. FDA spokesman Mike Herndon says that, "At this point, FDA sees no compelling need to analyze any more samples for acetaminophen." A third, independent lab also did not detect acetaminophen. It is not clear whether the FDA checked samples of the same brands of food in which acetaminophen was allegedly found because the initial laboratory could not initiate contact with the FDA or publicly identify the manufacturer because of client confidentiality. Only if the FDA contacted the lab could information be shared, and the FDA did not do this until June 12.

=== June 13, 2007 ===
Don Earl, a pet owner who links the death of his cat in January to consumption of Pet Pride cat food, reveals that he had paid ExperTox to analyze samples of the pet food. He alleges that the tests showed acetaminophen and cyanuric acid, but no melamine. The contaminated items were not subject to any recall.

== Contaminated corn gluten and rice protein concentrate from China acknowledged to have been found in Europe ==
=== June 21, 2007 ===
The Health & Consumer Protection Directorate-General of the European Commission (EC) acknowledged that corn gluten contaminated with melamine and rice protein concentrate contaminated with melamine and analogues, both originating from China, had been intercepted in Poland and Greece, respectively.

=== June 27, 2007 ===
Chinese state media announces that 180 food factories have been closed for improperly using industrial chemicals and recycled or expired food. The director of the Chinese General Administration of Quality Supervision, Inspection and Quarantine's quality control and inspection department states that "These are not isolated cases." Most of the offending manufacturers were unlicensed food plants with fewer than 10 employees. It is estimated that three-fourths of China's one million food processing plants are small and privately owned. In addition, the Chinese State Administration for Industry and Commerce states that it closed 152,000 unlicensed food manufacturers and retailers in 2006 for making fraudulent or low-quality products.

On the same day, the American Society for the Prevention of Cruelty to Animals announces that "fears of widespread contamination of pet food with acetaminophen are unfounded," confirming the results of FDA investigators. The ASPCA collaborated with toxicologists with the California Animal Health and Food Safety System at the University of California, Davis. They found no acetaminophen contamination in three cans of the same food that tested positive for acetaminophen at a Texas laboratory. Additionally, since the cat that had eaten the food suffered kidney, but not liver, failure, acetaminophen poisoning seems unlikely.

== Contaminated corn gluten from China pulled from market in Switzerland ==
=== June 28, 2007 ===
Official feed controllers of the Swiss research institute Agroscope Liebefeld in Posieux (ALP) stated that corn gluten contaminated with melamine, cyanuric acid and urea had been imported into Switzerland from China.

== U.S. Federal Indictments of two Chinese and one American company ==
=== February 6, 2008 ===
Owners and executives of Xuzhou Anying Biologic Technology Development Company, Suzhou Textiles, Silk, Light Industrial Products, Arts and Crafts, and ChemNutra were indicted on charges of intentionally defrauding and misleading American manufacturers about poisonous ingredients used in pet food.

== See also ==
- 2007 Chinese export recalls
