= Eukanuba =

Brand of dog and cat food

- Product type: Pet food
- Current owner: Mars, Incorporated (worldwide); Spectrum Brands (Europe only)
- Introduced: 1969; 57 years ago
- Markets: Worldwide
- Previous owners: Procter & Gamble (1999–2014)
- Website: eukanuba.com

Eukanuba is a brand of dog food and cat foodowned and manufactured by Mars, Incorporated worldwide and by Spectrum Brands in European markets; previously handled by Procter & Gamble from 1999 through 2014. The company produces 17 different formulas for dogs and 13 for cats.

Procter & Gamble (P&G) announced in April 2014 that it would sell its Eukanuba, Iams and Natura pet food brands in all markets except Europe to Mars, Incorporated for $2.9 billion in cash, arguing the deal would allow it to lose a slow performer and generate cash to grow core businesses. The deal for P&G Pet Care's operations in North America and Latin America was completed in August 2014. Mars, Inc. also exercised options to acquire P&G's pet food business in some parts of Asia Pacific, Middle East and Africa, including Australia, Japan and Singapore. P&G sold its European pet care business to Spectrum Brands in December 2014.

== History ==
In 1969, Paul Iams wanted to differentiate a new formula from other Iams products. Iams chose to name this new formula "Eukanuba", a term originated by jazz era personality Hoagy Carmichael, meaning "the tops" or "something supreme".

== Manufacturing ==
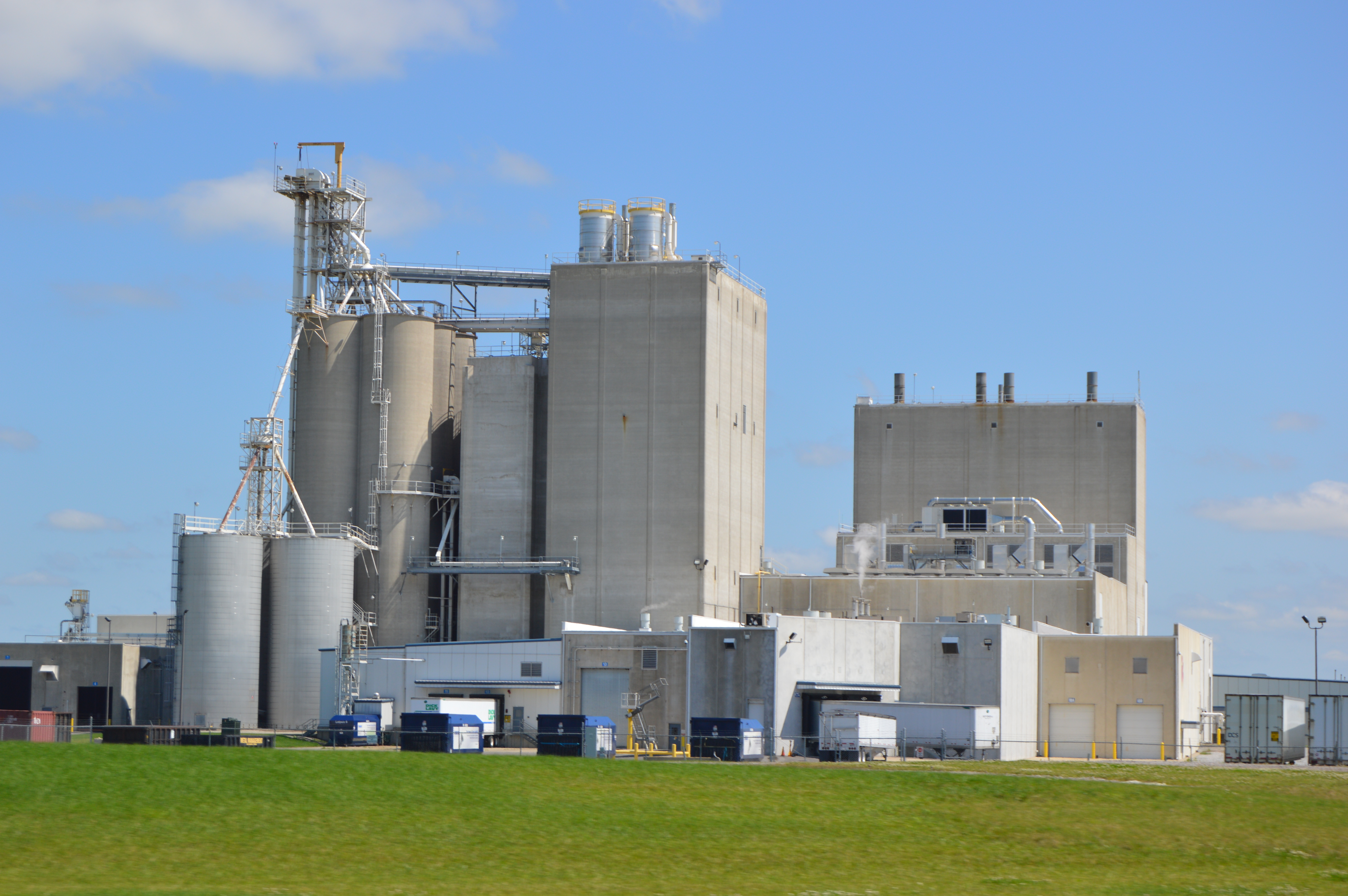
Leipsic manufacturing plant

When the Eukanuba manufacturing plant at Leipsic, Ohio was owned by P&G, it was P&G's largest dog food plant. Metal detectors are used to detect foreign objects that may have fallen in. Bags are marked by numbers to indicate the day and the hour the food was made using the DD/MM/YYYY format, so that the bags can be traced in case of a recall.

The ingredients in Eukanuba products contain both animal and animal by-products, which are the non-rendered lungs, spleen, kidneys, brain, livers, blood, bone, partially de-fatted low temperature fatty tissue, and stomachs and intestines freed of their contents. By-products do not include hair, horns, teeth and hooves. Most of the ingredients come from the United States, but a limited amount of nutritional supplements are imported from countries such as China.

== Sponsorships ==
Eukanuba was the sponsor of the AKC/Eukanuba National Championship. In 2008, the show began hosting the Eukanuba World Challenge.

Eukanuba is also a sponsor of the Teva Mountain Games.

Eukanuba is the title sponsor for the Eukanuba Stage Stop Race in Jackson, Wyoming announced in July, 2015; formerly the International Pedigree Stage Stop Sled Dog Race.

The AKC National Championship sponsorship was officially converted in December 2016 to sponsorship by Eukanuba's new sister company, Royal Canin. The show was renamed "AKC National Championship presented by Royal Canin." The initial Royal Canin presence included Jerry O'Connell as a celebrity commentator, and a grand prize of $50,000 for the winning dog. The winner of the initial AKC/Royal Canin partnership event was from the Puli dog breed, nicknamed "Preston."
