= Petco =

American pet supply store chain

Petco Health and Wellness Company, Inc.

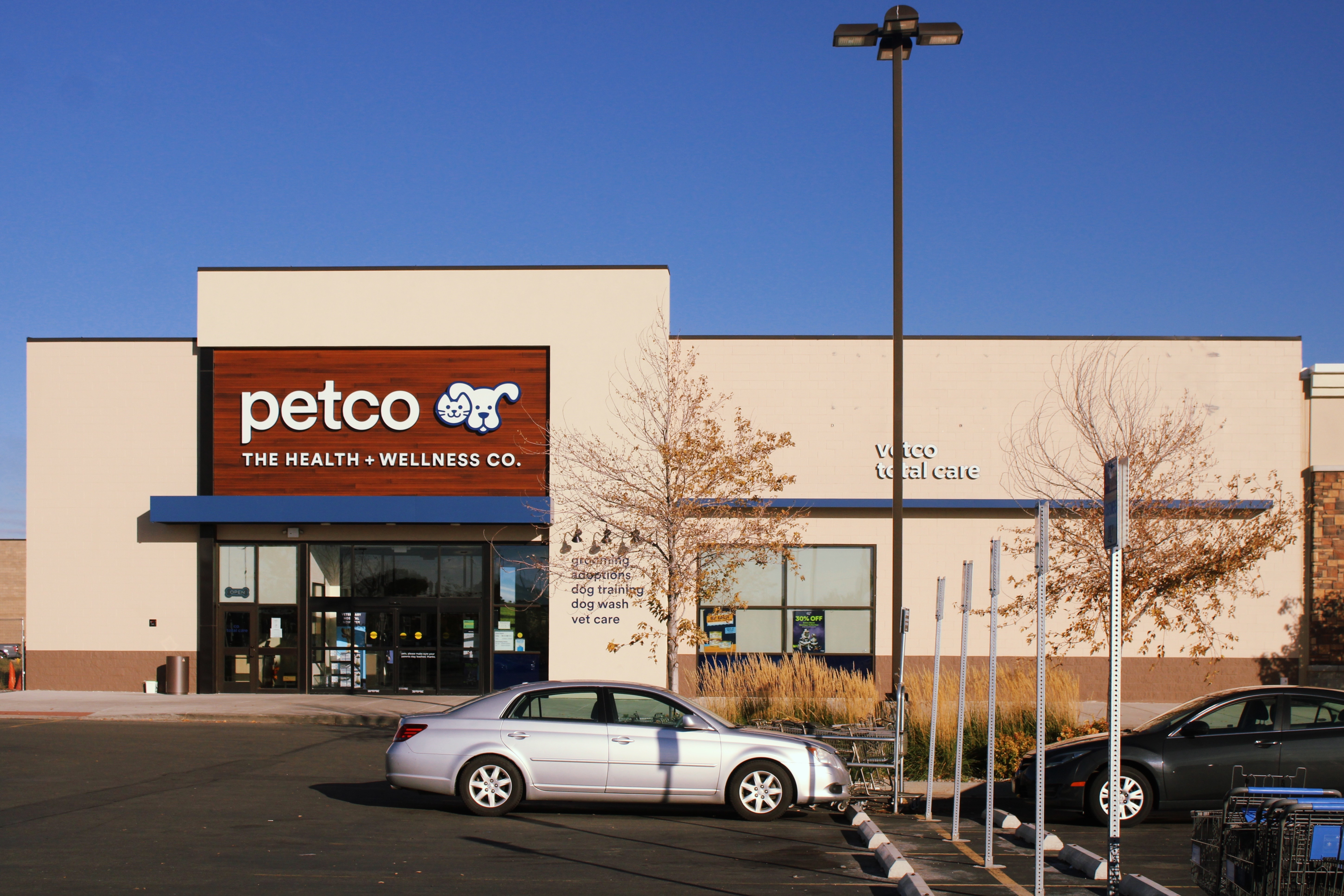
- Trade name: Petco
- Formerly: Petco Animal Supplies, Inc.
- Type: Public, formerly Private (until 1994, 2000–2002, 2006–2021)
- Traded as: Nasdaq: WOOF (Class A); Russell 2000 component; Nasdaq: PETC (1994–2000, 2002–2006)
- Industry: Retail
- Genre: Pet store
- Founded: As a mail-order company: 1965; 61 years ago San Diego County, California, U.S.; First retail store: 1976; 50 years ago La Mesa, California, U.S.
- Founder: Walter Evans
- Headquarters: San Diego, California, U.S.
- Number of locations: 1,382 (2025)
- Area served: United States (including Puerto Rico), Chile, Mexico, Canada (inside Canadian Tire)
- Key people: Mike Mohan (Interim CEO)
- Products: Pet supplies and live animals
- Brands: Unleashed by Petco, PetCoach, PetInsuranceQuotes.com
- Revenue: ▲US$4.434 billion (2020); ▲US$4.920 billion (2021)
- Operating income: ▲US$194 million (2021)
- Net income: ▼US$26.483 million (2021)
- Total assets: ▲US$1.912 billion (2021)
- Total equity: ▲US$219.083 million (2021)
- Number of employees: 27,000 (January 30, 2021)
- Website: petco.com

Petco Health and Wellness Company, Inc. is an American pet retailer with corporate offices in San Diego and San Antonio. Petco sells pet food, products, and services, as well as certain types of live small animals.

Founded in 1965 as a mail-order veterinary supply company in California, it grew into a pet food and supplies chain. Acquired by The Spectrum Group, Inc. and the Thomas H. Lee Company in 1988, it first went public on the NASDAQ in 1994 (ticker "PETC"). It was subsequently bought by Leonard Green & Partners and Texas Pacific Group in 2000 and went privately owned. In 2002, the company went public for the second time, again on the NASDAQ under ticker "PETC". In 2016, Petco was sold to CVC Capital Partners and the Canada Pension Plan Investment Board, who retained control when Petco held its third IPO in January 2021.

As of 2021, the company has approximately 1,500 Petco stores across the United States (including Puerto Rico), Chile, and Mexico. Stores sell pet food, pet supplies, small animals, and fish. Some stores offer services such as obedience training, dog grooming, pet vaccinations, and veterinary care, while also hosting adoption events. Unleashed by Petco are smaller stores that do not sell live animals. The company also owns the PetCoach app, PetInsuranceQuotes.com, and Vital Care, a subscription service for veterinary care.

The company owns the naming rights to Petco Park, the home of the San Diego Padres. Petco had yearly revenues of $4.1 billion in 2020, and was the 107th largest private company in the United States.

== History ==
=== 1965–1993 ===
Petco originated when Walter Evans, a co-owner of a Missouri-based distributor of pet supplies and products called United Pharmacal Company (UPCO), moved to San Diego County, California. In San Diego County in 1965, Evans initially set up a mail-order veterinary supply business with five associates. He became the company's first CEO. Evans opened his first retail store in 1976 in La Mesa, California, selling pet and veterinary supplies. In 1979 the company was rebranded Petco, and the first Petco store opened in Tigard, Oregon, a year later.

To compete with supermarkets, Petco focused on premium pet-food brands such as IAMS, Science Diet, and Nutro, which were introduced in the mid-1980s. In 1988 Petco acquired two other West Coast chains, Wellpet, Inc. and The Pet Department, bringing its store number to 130. By 1988, the company had 40 Petco stores, mainly in California. The same year, Petco was acquired by two private-equity firms, The Spectrum Group, Inc. and the Thomas H. Lee Company, and subsequently began acquiring other pet stores.

By 1990, Petco was heavily in debt, and Brian K. Devine of Toys "R" Us was hired to turn the company around as president and CEO. Devine rebranded the acquired WellPet and Pet Department stores Petco, also hiring new leadership and extending the chain's credit. Devine eschewed a big-box discount store model, instead prioritizing premium merchandise such as natural or organic pet food. He also brought in aquariums and fish to increase foot traffic.

Petco introduced Red Ruff the dog and Blue Mews the cat as its logo mascots in 1991, and the following year it adopted the tagline "Where the pets go.” In 1992 the company opened its first stores on the East Coast, also opening an East Coast distribution center.

=== 1994–2000s ===
In 1994, Devine became chairman in addition to president and CEO, a role he held until 2015. Petco went public on the NASDAQ under the stock ticker PETC, in 1994. The initial public offering provided capital for further expansion. From 1990 through 1995, Petco opened between 20 and 50 stores yearly.

By 1995, Petco and PetSmart had established themselves as the largest pet food and supply chains in the United States. The companies featured services such as obedience training, dog grooming, and pet vaccinations, and hosted pet adoption events in their stores. Differentiating itself from PetSmart, however, Petco located its stores in different areas, and limited its store size to avoid the warehouse format, among other differentiating factors.

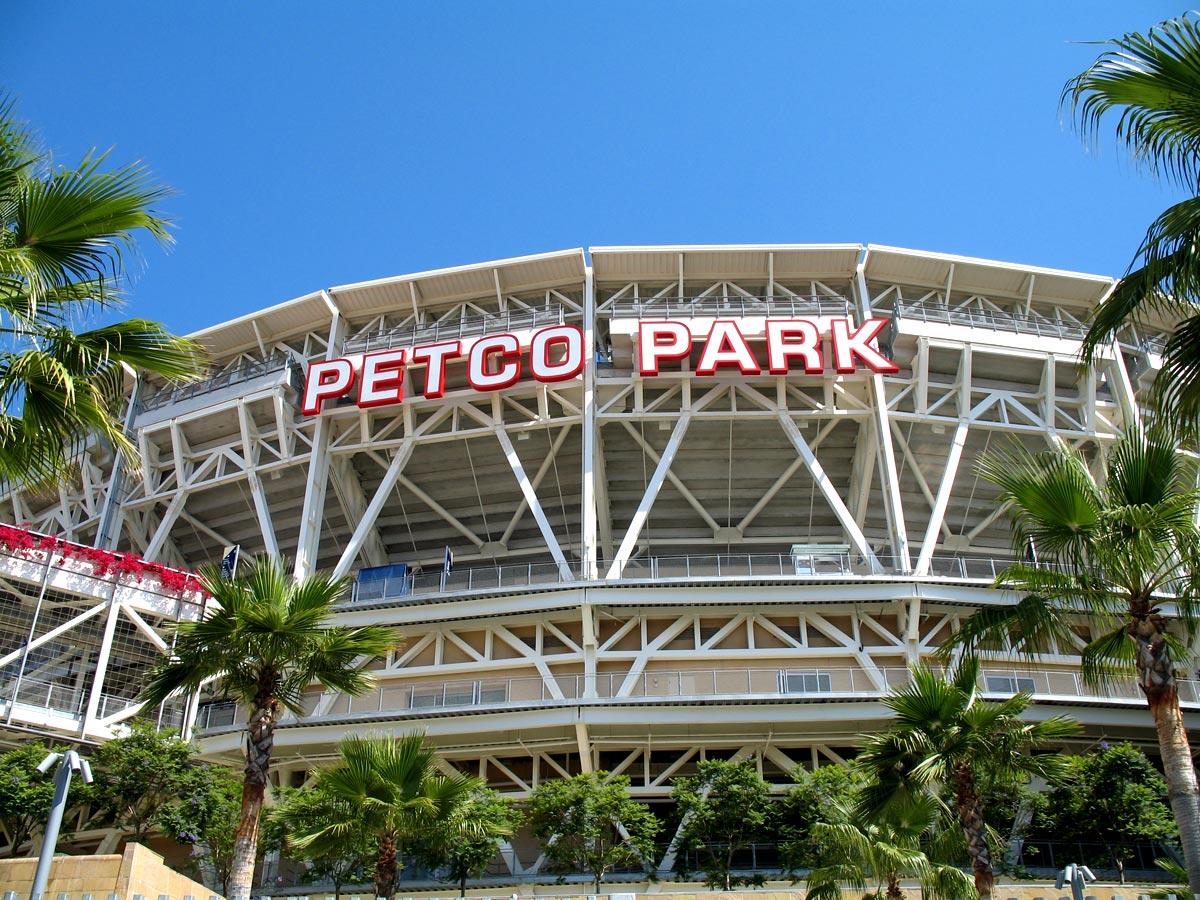
Petco Park

In 1997 Petco acquired 104 new stores, in large part from purchasing the competing chain PetCare in the Midwest and South. The aggressive growth in 1997 proved costly, and in 1998 Petco accrued $8 million in net losses and its stock value dropped significantly.

In July 1999, Petco invested $66 million in Petopia, a startup e-tailer, for 20% of the company. Petopia.com launched in August 1999. After the collapse of the dot-com bubble, in 2000 Petopia sold most of its assets to Petco. By 2001 Petopia.com redirected to Petco.com, with Petco utilizing Petopia.com's assets to create its own e-commerce site.

In May 2000, Petco agreed to a $600 million leveraged buyout by Leonard Green & Partners (LGP) and TPG Capital (TPG). With LGP and TPG contributing $92.5 million each in equity, their buyout deal closed in October 2000 and Petco was taken off the NASDAQ. LGP and TPG again took Petco public on the NASDAQ in 2002, retaining majority control until 2004.

In 2003, Petco bought the naming rights to San Diego's downtown baseball stadium, making it Petco Park when opened in 2004. Petco committed $60 million to the San Diego Padres for 22 years of naming rights. At the time, it was one of the highest prices paid for naming rights to a baseball park.

James Myers, who had previously been Petco's chief financial officer, became CEO of Petco in March 2004. He had been with Petco since 1990. He was succeeded as CEO in 2017 by Brad Weston, previously company president and chief merchandising officer.

"Think Adoption First" is a company philosophy and program, which encourages pet adoption rather than the purchase of companion animals whenever possible. Petco was criticized for selling large exotic birds in their shops, and in 2005, after pressure from PETA, Petco agreed to stop selling parrots and other large birds. Petco has never sold dogs or cats.

In the wake of reported distribution accounting errors, Petco's stock in mid July 2006 had dropped 50% from a high in January 2005. On July 14, 2006, Petco announced it would again be taken private in a leveraged buyout by LGP and TPG; the deal included the assumption of $120 million of Petco's debt, for a total transaction value of $1.8 billion. The acquisition by LGP and TPG closed in October 2006.

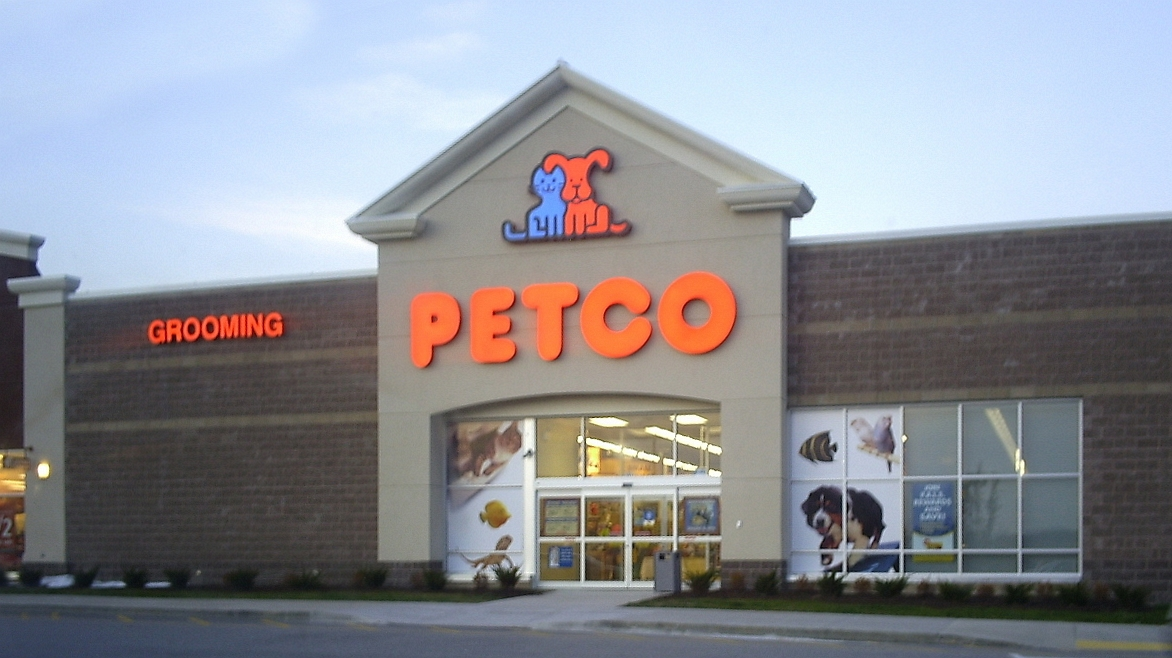
Petco store in 2008

The company stopped selling rabbits in 2008 to cut down on rabbits being surrendered to shelters. After the company stopped selling dog and cat food made in China several years previously, in January 2015, Petco was the first national pet retailer to stop selling dog and cat treats made in China, fulfilling a promise it had made in May 2014.

=== 2010–2020s ===
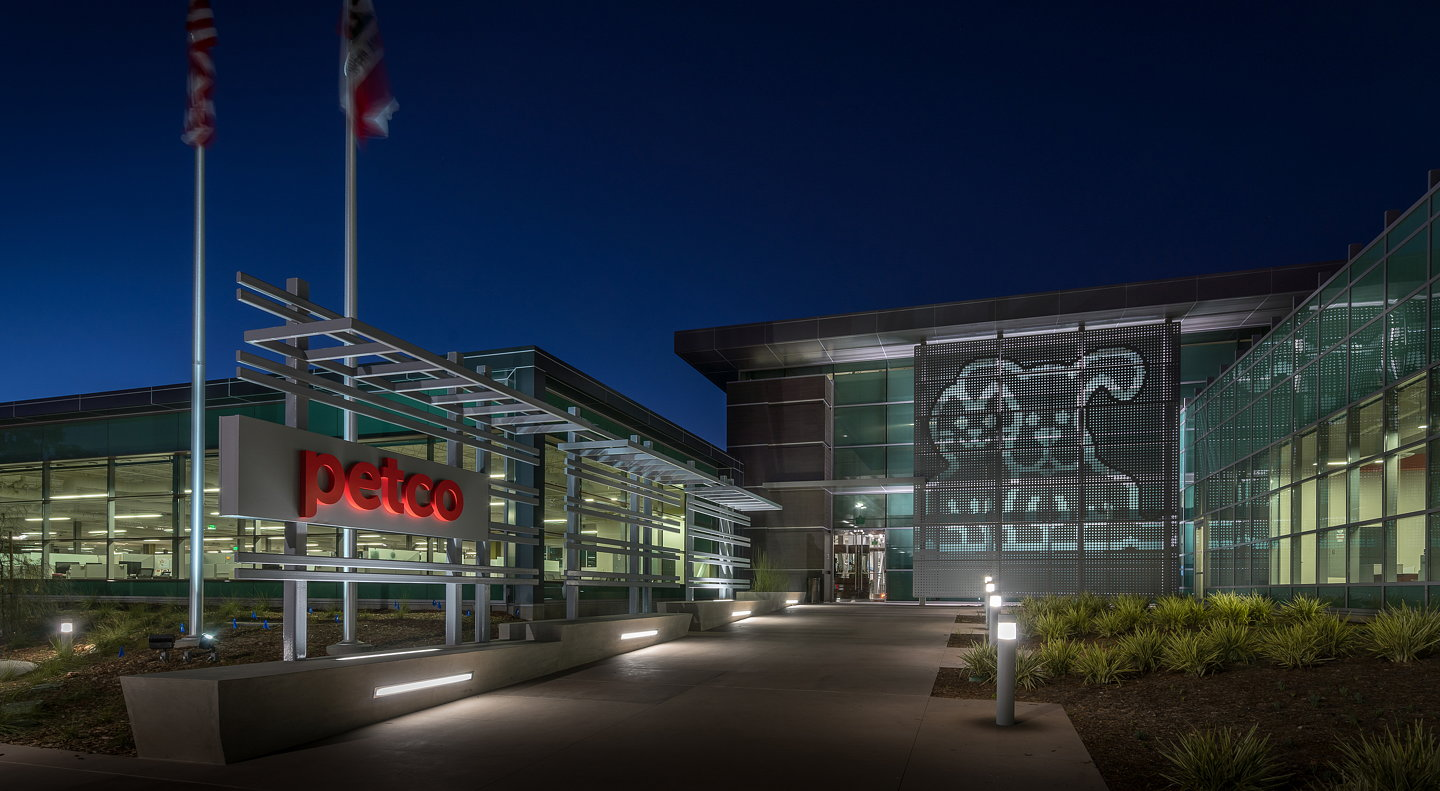
Petco headquarters in San Diego

In 2011, Petco also opened satellite headquarters in San Antonio, Texas to supplement its San Diego main office. It also changed its logo and tagline. The company expanded to Puerto Rico, opening a store in San Juan in 2012, and one in Ponce in 2013. Petco, through a joint venture with Grupo Gigante, also opened the first of several stores in Mexico in 2013.

In 2015, Petco acquired Drs. Foster and Smith, at the time the largest online retailer of pet supplies in the US. The purchase of Drs. Foster and Smith gave Petco an entry into the "veterinary prescription medicine" market, while allowing Petco to launch new lines of the brand's pet foods. Petco closed all operations of its Drs. Foster and Smith subsidiary in early 2019, redirecting the e-commerce site to Petco.com and filling prescriptions via Express Scripts. The Drs. Foster and Smith brand LiveAquaria.com was sold to Tropical Fish International in August 2020.

In 2015 Leonard Green & Partners and Texas Pacific Group investigated divesting Petco, and that August, Petco filed for another initial public offering. When subsequent merger discussions between Petco and PetSmart stalled over antitrust risks, Petco was acquired by CVC Capital Partners and the Canada Pension Plan Investment Board in a deal worth US$4.6 billion in February 2016, with Petco withdrawing its IPO plans.

In August 2018, a partnership was signed with Canadian Tire to begin selling Petco's private label brands of pet food and accessories at its 500+ Canadian stores as a store-within-a-store concept, bringing Petco to the Canadian market. In November 2018, Petco announced that it would stop selling pet food and treats containing artificial colors, flavors, and preservatives, banning certain artificial ingredients. In 2020, Petco ended the sale of shock collars in its stores.

Petco had yearly revenues of $4.1 billion in 2020, and was the 107th largest private company in the United States. The company once again changed its logo and tagline in October 2020.

In January 2021, Petco held its third IPO, with the intent of using the proceeds to pay down debt. In conjunction with the listing, the company changed its corporate name from Petco Animal Supplies, Inc. to Petco Health and Wellness Company, Inc. That same month, the company began trading again on the NASDAQ under a new symbol, WOOF. The IPO raised $864 million, and CVC Capital Partners and Canada Pension Plan Investment Board retained control as majority owners.

In April 2021, Petco removed 32 traditional rawhide products, to be replaced with products that were "more easily digestible" for dogs. Also that month, Petco announced that half of all its products would be "sustainable" by the end of 2025.

In October 2023, CreditRiskMonitor reported that Petco was nearing a potential Chapter 11 bankruptcy filing.

On March 13, 2024 Petco announced that its CEO, Ron Coughlin, is stepping down, and board member and Best Buy executive R. Michael Mohan will take over as interim chief executive

On September 10, 2024 Petco revealed Joel Anderson as its new CEO during the company's second-quarter earnings call. Anderson is formerly the CEO of Five Below and a senior executive at Walmart.

== Products and services ==
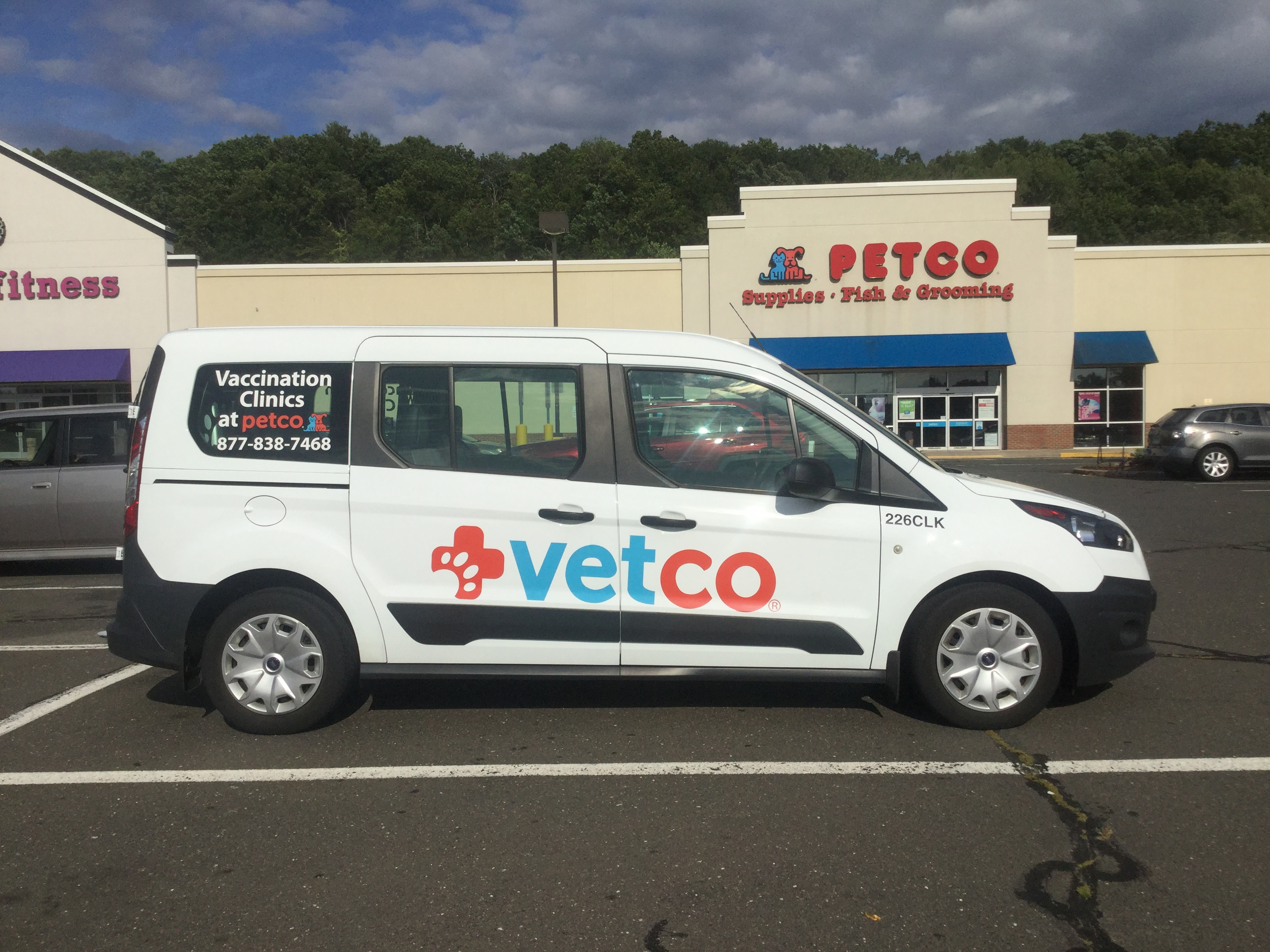
Vetco car outside the Newington, CT store in 2019.

Petco stores sell products such as pet food, pet supplies, small animals, and fish. Petco also owns and operates PetCoach, a web service and app that provides pet advice. It owns PetInsuranceQuotes.com, a pet insurance comparison website. The company offers services and hosts adoption events; some stores offer obedience training, dog grooming, pet vaccinations, and veterinary care.

As of 2022, Petco's website lists some of the following brands: Hill's Science Diet, Instinct Pet Food, Royal Canin, Blue Buffalo Cat & Dog Food, Merrick, and Orijen among others. In 2018, Petco partnered with JustFoodForDogs, which produces "human-grade" pet food.

In 2022, while Petco's website listed services including dog grooming and dog training, veterinary services, adoptions, a self-serve dog wash, and pet insurance, in-home training was unavailable due to the coronavirus pandemic. Petco owns PupBox, a monthly delivery service.

Petco's subscription service offers vet visits for cats and dogs at its veterinary clinics, and nail trims and teeth cleanings for dogs. Launched in 1997, Petco operates a loyalty card program.

=== Staff and facilities ===
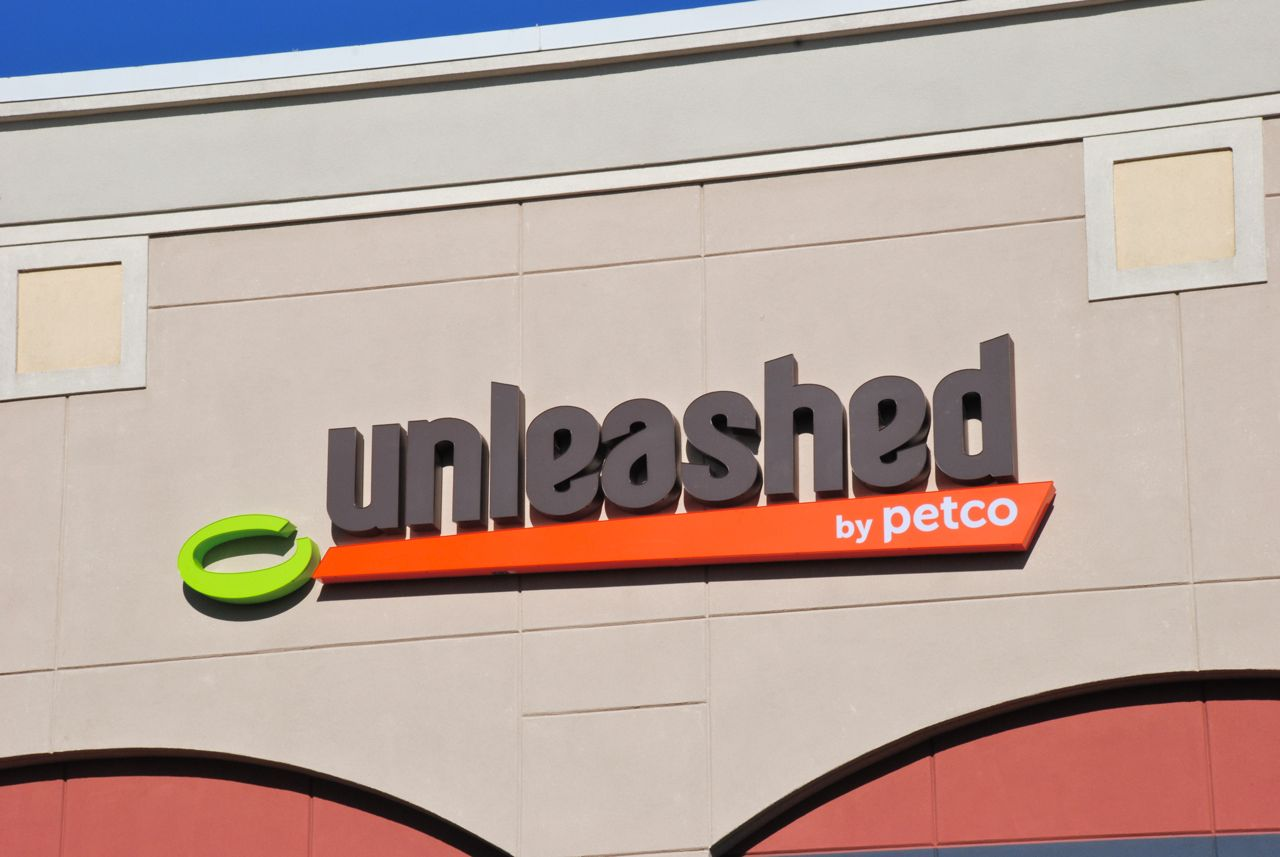
Sign on an Unleashed store that opened in Oregon in 2013

In June 2018, Ron Coughlin, a veteran Hewlett-Packard and PepsiCo executive, took over as CEO. Ron Coughlin serves as chairman of the board. Mike Nuzzo serves as CFO and COO.

The company has approximately 1,500 Petco stores across the United States, Chile, Mexico, and Puerto Rico. As of November 23, 2020, Petco had 27,000 employees and was headquartered in San Diego, California.

Of Petco's stores, 105 contain in-store veterinary clinics. In 2022, Petco also operated 65 Unleashed by Petco stores in nine states. The Unleashed stores mainly sell natural dog and cat foods and do not carry live animals. The smaller Unleashed stores are intended to create a community feeling, hosting pet parties and offering services such as adoption events, dog training, and vaccinations. They also sell high-end goods and toys made in the United States.

== Legal issues ==
In June 2010, prosecutors from Marin, Los Angeles, San Diego, San Mateo, and Santa Barbara counties announced that Petco had agreed to settle a $1.75 million consumer protection lawsuit, without admitting liability. The settlement stems from a lawsuit filed in San Diego Superior Court that alleges Petco overcharged its customers and improperly cared for some animals, following inspections of Petco stores throughout California from 2005 through 2008. Petco paid more than $850,000 to resolve a similar case in 2004.

In September 2011, a Petco location in Johnson City, New York came under fire when nearly 100 animals drowned during a flood caused by Tropical Storm Lee. Despite severe weather warnings and flood advisories for the nearby river in the days prior, including from the National Weather Service (as stated by the Johnson City police), Petco initially claimed it had not received warnings, and that the casualties were caused by a backup in the store's drain/sewage line, not by the flooding that submerged the store in four feet of water. Johnson City Mayor Dennis Hannon called Petco's initial claims "absurd,” and stated that "for them not to go down there is just absolutely disgusting,” alluding to the sewer/drain line backup being only a small part of the problem. On September 12, 2011, Petco issued a statement accepting full responsibility for the event, saying that they "misjudged" the risk of a flood. PETA called for a criminal investigation against Petco.

In 2013, a 10-year-old boy died when he contracted rat-bite fever from his pet rat and his family filed a lawsuit against Petco, but the jury found Petco not negligent or liable.

== Petco Love ==
Petco Love, formerly The Petco Foundation, was created in 1999 to help promote and improve the welfare of companion animals, and spends more than $30 million to support this cause annually. An independent nonprofit organization, Petco Love works with local animal welfare groups across the country to host in-store adoption events and helps find homes for companion animals. The foundation also supports spay and neuter efforts, animal assistant therapy programs, and education about the humane treatment of animals.

On January 24, 2019, Petco Love partnered with Skechers, which pledged to donate a portion of its Bobs from Skechers charity's proceeds to the foundation. On April 15, 2019, it was announced that the foundation had donated $500,000 to the Animal Services department of El Paso, Texas to create an exhibit of adoptable domestic cats at the El Paso Zoo. In 2021, Petco debuted its "Love Lost facial recognition program", which uses a database to help locate missing dogs in the shelter system.

== See also ==
- List of companies headquartered in San Diego
- List of superstores
- List of California companies
- Hamster racing
