= ChemNutra =

American importing company

ChemNutra is an American importer of ingredients for food, animal feed and pharmaceuticals based in Summerlin, Nevada Self-described as "The China-Source Experts" they import their products from China and provide them to North American manufacturers. The chief executive officer is Stephen S. Miller and the president is Sally Qing Miller.

Companies supplied by ChemNutra include Menu Foods and at least two other pet food manufacturers, as well as the pet food ingredient supplier The Scoular Co.

== Recall ==
On March 16, 2007, pet food manufacturer Menu Foods announced a recall of dog food sold under 53 brands, and cat food sold under 42 brands, after an unknown number of animals suffered kidney failure after eating it. On April 3 the United States Food and Drug Administration (FDA) distributed a recall notice issued by ChemNutra for potentially-contaminated wheat gluten that had been imported from what the FDA alleges is one of its three Chinese suppliers, the Xuzhou Anying Biologic Technology Development. Mao Lijun, the general manager of Xuzhou Anying Biologic, denies directly supplying ChemNutra with the wheat gluten, claiming that "We have never exported to the U.S." since they are a trading company.

On February 6, 2008, a federal grand jury in Kansas City, Missouri, returned a 27 count criminal indictment against the owners of ChemNutra and in the case headed by the FDA Office of Criminal Investigations that was investigating XAC and SSC.

As of April 6, at least 471 cases of poisoning have been reported and 104 animals have died. The FDA reports that they have received over 12,000 complaints related to the poisoning.

On April 5, the company recalled all 782 tonnes of wheat gluten it had imported from Xuzhou Anying Biologic Technology Development.

The FDA served a search warrant on the company on April 27.

By May 18, the company had hired two companies to help it deal with the public relations fall out from the contamination.

== See also ==
- 2007 pet food recalls
- Timeline of the 2007 pet food recalls
