= Simmons Foods =

Animal food supplier

- Type: Private
- Industry: Food Manufacturing
- Founded: 1949; 77 years ago
- Founder: M.H. Bill Simmons
- Headquarters: Siloam Springs, Arkansas, United States of America
- Key people: Mitch Newton, M.H. Bill Simmons, Todd Simmons (CEO), Mike Czuba, Mark C. Simmons (Chairman)
- Revenue: 2.4 billion US$ (2021)
- Number of employees: Approx. 7000 (2021)
- Divisions: Pet food; Animal Nutrition; Prepared Foods
- Website: simmonsfoods.com

Simmons Foods and its affiliates process and supply poultry, feed ingredients, and pet food. Simmons poultry primarily provides chicken for restaurants such as Chick-Fil-A, Panda Express, Jubilee, Cheesecake Factory, Taco Bell, KFC, and a dozen other chains. Their poultry division also co-packs for brands such as Great Value. Simmons Animal Nutrition division provides feed ingredients for brands such as Blue Buffalo, Hills, Nestle, Mars, and Champion. Their pet food division specializes in fresh and canned pet food for brands such as Great Value, Blue Buffalo, Hills, Nestlé, and 2 dozen other brands out of their Kansas, Iowa, and Arkansas plants. They are one of the largest providers of canned pet food in the United states. Their 3 business units are based in Arkansas, Missouri, Iowa, Pennsylvania, Delaware, and Kansas.

The company's official name is Simmons Foods, Inc. & Affiliates.

== History ==
Simmons Foods was founded in 1949 by founder M.H. Bill Simmons, their current CEO is his grandson Todd Simmons.

The company was incorporated in 1984.

In August 2010, the Simmons Pet Food division bought out Menu Foods for $239 million. Production facilities inherited from Menu Foods are located in Emporia, Kansas; Pennsauken, New Jersey; and Streetsville, Ontario. The plants produce wet pet food in aluminium and steel cans at a rate of 1,000 cans per minute, or 1,110 85-gram pouches per minute. Jointly, the plants are able to produce over one billion containers a year. In the same year the company's revenue was US$1 billion.

In April 2014, plans were announced to expand product at the Emporia site.

On July 31, 2017, Simmons Foods opened an ingredient production facility in Siloam Springs, AR. Since 2015, the company has invested an estimated $30 million in the facility where it will produce fresh and frozen meat ingredients for pet food manufacturers. In spring of 2022 a $15 million cooler expansion was announced with an expected completion date of fall of the same year.

On September 27, 2017, Simmons Prepared Foods announced it will build a new chicken facility in Benton County between Decatur and Gentry, Arkansas. The company plans to invest $300 million and the operation will create approximately 1,500 jobs. Operations are expected to begin in 2019.

On November 1, 2017, Simmons Pet Food announced a facility expansion in Emporia, Kansas. The $38 million investment will increase operations by 200,000 square feet and create approximately 100 new jobs in the Emporia area. Operations are expected to begin in 2019.

Simmons Foods made some changes at the end of 2021 shutting down operations for dry dog food and treats in Siloam Springs, Arkansas to focus on their more profitable canned and wet pet food operations.

In January 2022, the company announced $100M expansion at its Van Buren site. The development will provide facilities for producing prepared food and will increase the jobs at the site from 600 to 700.

== Manufacturing ==
Simmons foods is made up of three divisions. These include Prepared Foods, Animal Nutrition, and Pet Food.

Simmons has American operations in Siloam Springs, Arkansas; Emporia, Kansas; Edgerton, Kansas; Decatur, Arkansas; Gentry, Arkansas; Van Buren, Arkansas; Fort Smith, Arkansas; Milan, Missouri; Southwest City, Missouri; Quakertown, Pennsylvania; Bridgeville, Delaware; Dubuque, Iowa and Canadian operations in Mississauga, Ontario.

== Personnel ==
As of 2022, Todd Simmons is the CEO and Vice Chairman of Simmons Foods, starting the role in 2013. He began working at Simmons in 1990 was promoted to chief executive officer and Vice Chairman in December 2012. In 2016, he was selected as one of 10 local business leaders in the Northwest Arkansas Business Journal's “C-Suite Awards.”

As of 2022, Mark Simmons is the Chairman of Simmons Foods, he has been chairman since 1987. He first joined Simmons in 1968 after graduating from the University of Arkansas. He was named president in 1974 following the death of his father, M.H. “Bill” Simmons, president and founder of Simmons Foods. He was inducted into the 29th Annual Arkansas Agriculture Hall of Fame in March 2017.

== Educational support ==
Since 1979, the M.H. "Bill" Simmons Scholarship Program has been providing financial educational assistance to the children of Simmons Foods team members.

The program has reached several milestones in its 40th year, providing a combined total of more than $1.1 million in college and vocational scholarships to over 1,000 students, according to a press release from the company. In 2019, the scholarship program awarded $134,000 in scholarships to 72 recipients.

== Controversy ==
On November 1, 2017, the ACLU of Oklahoma named Simmons and several other companies in a class action lawsuit on behalf of past participants at the Drug and Alcohol Recovery Program facilities in Tahlequah, Oklahoma and Decatur, Arkansas. The filing asserted that Simmons knowingly benefited from human trafficking and other labor violations. The filing is consistent with investigative journalism work conducted by Reveal (part of Centers for Investigative Reporting) and The Oklahoman. The Oklahoman specifically mentioned Simmons Food as a place where the rehabilitation program participants were being sent. Reveal's investigation into the labor conditions have alleged that Simmons has become so reliant on this forced labor that their plants would shut down if participants from these programs did not show up. The ACLU has also filed suit against Simmons in Arkansas regarding similar allegations. On January 11, 2018, all claims against Simmons were voluntarily dismissed. On December 10, 2020, the U.S. District Court for the Northern District of Oklahoma in the Case of Arthur Copeland, et al., issued an opinion and order dismissing the case. On May 1, 2023 the U.S. Court of Appeals for the 10th Circuit reversed and remanded the decision of the District Court, finding that the alleged conduct of Simmons Foods and CAAIR was not excluded from federal jurisdiction under the Rooker-Feldman doctrine.

In 2022, Simmons Foods was named as one of nineteen companies accused by Washington State of conspiracy to artificially inflate for price of chicken.
