= Clay Mathile =

American businessman (1941–2023)

- Born: Clayton Lee Mathile; January 11, 1941; Portage, Ohio, U.S.
- Died: August 26, 2023 (aged 82); Dayton, Ohio, U.S.
- Education: Ohio Northern University
- Occupation: Businessman
- Spouse: MaryAnn Maas
- Children: 5

Clayton Lee Mathile (pronounced [Muh-til]) (January 11, 1941 – August 26, 2023) was an American billionaire businessman best known for leading Iams to nearly $1 billion in sales before selling it to Procter & Gamble (P&G) for $2.3 billion in 1999 in what was, at the time, the largest cash-only deal in P&G's history.

== Early life and education ==
Clayton Lee Mathile was born on January 11, 1941, as the oldest child of Wilbert "Bill" Ray Mathile and Helen Good Mathile, in Portage, Ohio where his parents owned a 40-acre farm.

Mathile graduated at age 16 from Portage High School, ranking first in his class of 14 students. He also lettered in basketball and earned an honorable mention for the all-state team. He went on to attend Ohio Northern University in Ada, Ohio, where he also played on the basketball team. He initially studied mechanical engineering before transferring to the business school. When an expected scholarship fell through, Mathile took a job pumping gas. Mathile graduated a quarter early in February 1962 with a business degree.

== Early career ==
Mathile began his career as an accountant at a General Motors manufacturing plant in Toledo, Ohio. A year later, he joined the Campbell's, where he remained for seven years and held a series of positions in cost accounting, inventory control, and purchasing.

In 1970, Mathile accepted a leadership role at a small, regional pet food manufacturer: The Iams Food Company in Dayton, Ohio. To raise awareness of Iams' product, Mathile spent weekends at dog shows, handing out samples that his children helped him package in their basement. In 1975, after shortages of ingredients almost drove the company under, Mathile purchased a 50%-ownership interest in the company from founder and owner Paul Iams for $100,000. Mathile convinced Paul Iams that the company needed to build its own manufacturing plant.

== Corporate leadership ==
During his early tenure, Mathile oversaw The Iams Company's rapid growth. Mathile purchased the remaining ownership shares from Iams in 1982, thus becoming its sole owner and CEO. At the time, the company had $13 million in sales.

From the outset, Mathile focused strongly on product quality, research and development, and customer outreach, including marketing efforts targeting pet owners, high-end breeders, and veterinarians. He offered a 100% money-back guarantee to any customer who wasn't satisfied and established a customer support department equipped to answer consumer questions about their pets — even on topics unrelated to pet food, such as handling grief over the loss of a pet. He also established a national distribution network. Insisting that vendors be paid within 30 days ensured that The Iams Company had the best supplies available — even during shortages. Mathile also honored Paul Iams' commitment to science by funding a new research and development center, which worked to ensure that dogs and cats received the best nutrition possible from Iams and Eukanuba.

Eventually, Mathile appointed the company's president and chief operating officer Tom MacLeod as CEO and became chairman of the board. By 1999, Mathile had grown The Iams Company to a 5.7% share of the U.S. pet food market and international sales of 100 different products in 75 countries. He sold the company to international conglomerate Procter & Gamble for $2.3 billion. He distributed $100 million of the sale proceeds among Iams employees, committed $100 million to fund large-scale, community projects in the Dayton area, and distributed portions to his adult children.

== Philanthropy ==
Mathile served as a trustee on several nonprofit boards focused on education, nutrition, medical innovation, and social justice.

== Political activity ==
Together with his spouse, Mathile contributed $26,600 to Donald Trump's 2020 presidential campaign.

== Other businesses ==
Mathile and his family have started other businesses. They operate under the umbrella of Myrian Capital in Dayton, Ohio, founded and chaired by their youngest son, Mike Mathile.

== Personal life and death ==
On July 7, 1962, Mathile married MaryAnn Maas, the woman he dated since high school. They have five children and lived in Brookville, Ohio. He died on August 26, 2023, at the age of 82.

== Honors and awards ==
- Ohio Northern University, honorary doctorate in business, 1991
- Ernst & Young, Entrepreneur of the Year Award, National Finalist, 1999
- Ernst & Young, Entrepreneur of the Year Award, Supporter of Entrepreneurship Award Winner, South Central Ohio & Kentucky Region, 1999
- Dayton Business Journal, Regional Leader of the Year, 2008
- Better Business Bureau, Dayton Chapter, Inaugural Torch Award, 2010
