= Tetra (company) =

Pet Fish and Aquatic Animal Food Company

Tetra Holding GmbH.
- Industry: Fishkeeping
- Founded: 1951; 75 years ago Germany
- Headquarters: Melle, Germany
- Key people: Jochem van Rietschoten, Andreas Rouvé, Anja Krüger General management
- Products: Tetramin; Aquasafe; Tetratec; Tetrawhisper
- Number of employees: 700+ (2006)
- Parent: United Pet Group (Spectrum Brands)
- Website: www.tetra-fish.com

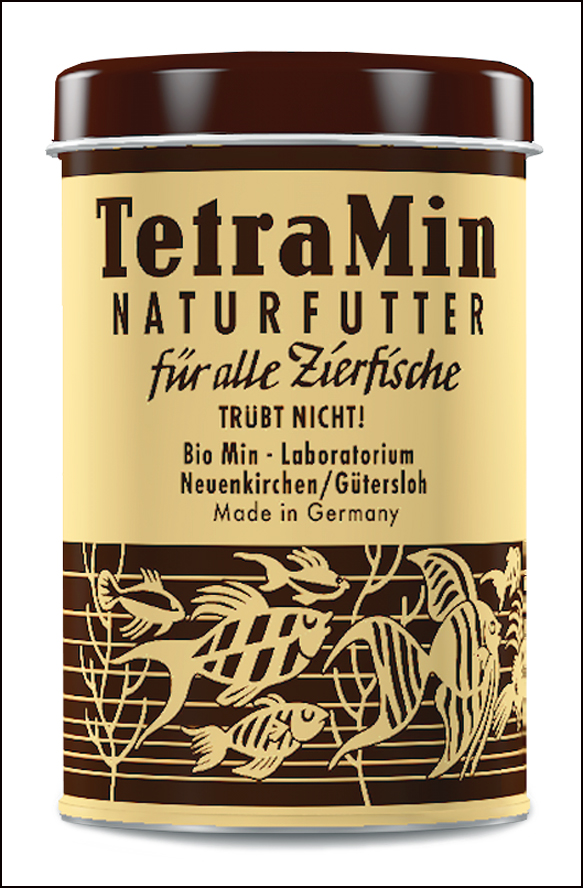
TetraMin.

Tetra or the Tetra Werke (Company) is a fish food manufacturing company founded by a young German scientist, Dr. Ulrich Baensch.

== History and profile ==
In the 1950s, there were only about 50,000 fish keepers in Germany. The hobby at the time was considered very time-consuming, rare, difficult and complicated, because it required routine collection of live food from streams and river beds, until the invention of dried flake food (Tetramin) for tropical fish by Dr. Ulrich Baensch. Baensch's Tetramin fish food consisted of four different type of flakes and vitamins. The brand name Tetramin was derived from the Greek word Tetra (meaning four) and the third syllable of the word vitamin.

The Tetra group employs over 700 colleagues, has representatives in more than 90 countries worldwide and is the largest manufacturer of aquaristic and pond products in the world. Apart from pet food, Tetra supplies fish keepers and pond owners with other products such as water conditioners, plant conditioners, technical equipment and medicinal products. It was once a part of Warner-Lambert and was later acquired by Pfizer. In December 2002, Pfizer sold the Tetra aquaristic and pond business to the "Triton Fund", a private independent European investment fund. Investors in the Triton Fund include European insurances and banks as well as significant American institutions. The Triton Fund paid $238.5 million US for the Tetra business. Three years later, on April 29, 2005, Tetra Holding GmbH was acquired by Spectrum Brands, a global consumer products company.

== See also ==
- Fish food
