= Paul F. Iams =

American businessman (1915–2004)

Paul Iams
- Born: Paul Falknor Iams; August 11, 1915; Dayton, Ohio, United States
- Died: October 26, 2004 (aged 89); Chappaqua, New York, United States
- Education: Ohio State University
- Occupations: Entrepreneur, animal nutritionist
- Years active: 1946–1982
- Known for: Founder of Iams
- Spouse: Jane Landrum (d. 1996)

Paul Falknor Iams (/ˈaɪmz/; August 11, 1915 – October 26, 2004) was the founder of the Iams company, known for its line of pet foods.

== Life ==
Iams was born in Dayton, Ohio, on August 11, 1915. He was a talented high school athlete who won the Ohio State Tennis Championship in 1933. In 1937, he graduated from Ohio State University and became interested in the pet food business while working with his father, Harry, a grain broker. He joined Procter & Gamble in 1938 and was a soap salesman before joining the Navy in World War II.

During the Great Depression, Iams sold dog food. He learned that not even severe economic hardship would stop owners from buying food to feed their pets. This was a revelation to Iams, as most owners fed their pets leftovers or their own concoctions. A self-taught animal nutritionist, Iams founded his company in 1946, and, by 1950, was creating his own recipes in his own plant in Dayton.

After completing his service, Iams decided to create high quality pet food, based on his original nutritional theories and research. He was convinced that there was a strong specialty market for a nutritionally complete dog food. His original customer base was composed of Midwestern veterinarians and dog breeders.

In 1950, he opened his first manufacturing plant in Dayton, Ohio with five employees. He named his first dog food, "Iams 999" to imply that it was nearly perfect.

In 1982, Iams sold the business to Clay Mathile, who had joined Iams in 1970 and was Paul's business partner and friend. In 1999, the Mathiles sold The Iams Company to Procter & Gamble.

In 1987, the Paul F. Iams Technical Center in Lewisburg, Ohio, was opened as a research facility dedicated to researching the emotional and physical needs of companion animals.

Paul Iams died at the age of 89, on Tuesday, October 26, 2004, in Chappaqua, New York. Until a month earlier, he had lived in Sun City West, Arizona, where he retired in 1982 with his wife, the former Jane Landrum, who died in 1996.
