= Spectrum Brands =

American manufacturing company

Spectrum Brands Holdings, Inc.
- Type: Public
- Traded as: NYSE: SPB; Russell 1000 component
- Industry: Manufacturing
- Predecessor: Rayovac Corporation
- Founded: January 17, 1906; 120 years ago (as French Battery Company) in Madison, Wisconsin, US
- Headquarters: Middleton, Wisconsin, US
- Key people: David M. Maura (executive chairman & CEO)
- Revenue: ▼US$2.81 billion (2025)
- Operating income: ▼US$125 million (2025)
- Net income: ▼US$100 million (2025)
- Total assets: ▼US$3.38 billion (2025)
- Total equity: ▼US$1.91 billion (2025)
- Number of employees: 3,000 (2025)
- Divisions: Global Appliances; Home and Garden; Global Pet Supplies
- Website: www.spectrumbrands.com
- Footnotes; Financials as of September 30, 2025.

Spectrum Brands Holdings, Inc., is an American multinational consumer products conglomerate headquartered in Middleton, Wisconsin. It was established in 2005 as the successor to Rayovac Corporation.

The company manufactures and markets home appliances under the Remington, Black+Decker, George Foreman, and Russell Hobbs brand names, lawn and garden care products under the Spectracide and Garden Safe brand names, and insect repellents under the Cutter and Repel brand names. Spectrum owns several pet care companies, both in the aquarium supply and companion animal trades. In the aquarium business, Spectrum owns Tetra, Whisper, Marineland, Perfecto, Jungle, Instant Ocean, Visi-Therm, and other product lines. Companion animal lines consist of Dingo, Nature's Miracle, Lazy Pet, Wonderbox, Furminator, IAMS, Eukanuba and others. Both aquarium lines and companion lines are part of Spectrum's United Pet Group based in Cincinnati.

== History ==
=== Rayovac Corporation (1906–2005) ===
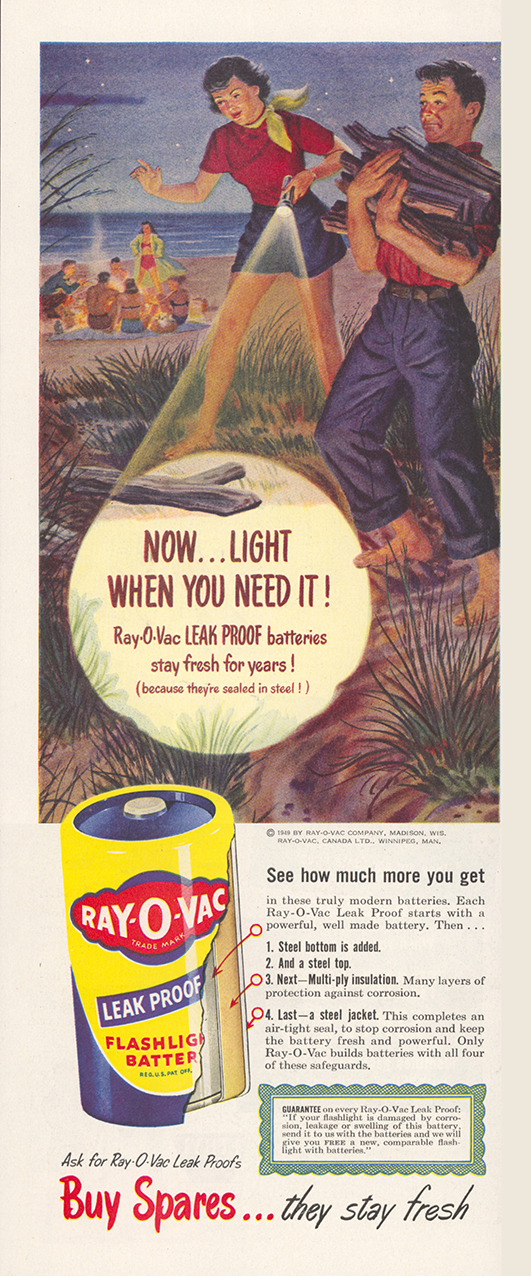
Ray-O-Vac Advertisement USA 1949

In 1906, the French Battery Company was founded in Chicago by James Bowen Ramsay (1869–1952). Its first president was German-born chemist Alfred Landau, who had been making batteries in Europe. The Ramsay collective invested in Landau's functioning low-profile Columbia Dry Battery Company which had been halted by copyright issues regarding the adopted name "Columbia". The re-started and renamed assembly plant soon relocated to Wisconsin where Landau's efforts to advance the French company too quickly, combined with a bad run of batteries, led to virtual bankruptcy and he was sacked. He moved on to Toronto and set up a factory making X-Cell brand batteries for Canada.

Neither Ramsay nor the other shareholders knew how to make batteries, but Ramsay's leadership kept the enterprise alive, by having assembly line staff make the "Fleur de lis" branded batteries to a lower standard. Ramsay's fiery self-belief in the industry led him to contract a university chemist C. F. Burgess to concoct a battery to rival those made in America and Europe. Burgess actually succeeded, to his own financial cost, and the company survived, with him becoming a shareholder; but after a fire destroyed the plant in 1915, he left to found his own successful battery company. French battery production accelerated through World War I, and by 1920, the French Battery Company had US$2.74 million in sales and 600 employees, and 1,000 employees in 1931.

In 1930, the company name was changed to Ray-O-Vac, an allusion to the then-new technology of vacuum tubes and electron rays. In 1933, the company patented the first wearable vacuum tube hearing aid. During World War II, Rayovac supplied the United States military with nearly 500 million batteries. As a result of this, they were awarded eight Army-Navy "E" awards for major contributions to victory.

In 2003, Rayovac decided to diversify, and acquired non-battery related businesses including Remington Products and United Pet Group. In 2004, Rayovac successfully underbid Energizer (Eveready) as RadioShack's battery supplier and produced the "Enercell" brand of battery sold exclusively at RadioShack. In January 2005, Rayovac purchased United Industries Corporation for about $476 million in cash and stock. Brands included in United Industries were Vigoro, Spectracide and Sta-Green lawn products, Cutter, Hot Shot and Repel insect control products, and pet supply products with the Marineland, Perfecto, and Eight in One brands.

In 2005, Tetra, a major provider of pet-fish products, was acquired. This diversification prompted the name change from Rayovac to Spectrum Brands. Rayovac also bought other battery companies including VARTA, Ningbo Baowang, and Microlite S.A. The Microlite acquisition included the rights to the Rayovac name in Brazil, giving the company worldwide rights to the Rayovac name. With this acquisition, Rayovac consolidated its presence in the majority of countries in Latin America.

=== Spectrum Brands (since 2005) ===
On February 3, 2009, Spectrum filed for Chapter 11 bankruptcy protection. The company later emerged from bankruptcy on August 28, 2009. Since emerging from Chapter 11, Spectrum has announced year-over-year increases in sales and adjusted earnings before interest, taxes, depreciation, and amortization (EBITDA) for the second quarter of their fiscal 2010.

Rayovac, as a division of Spectrum Brands, remained headquartered in Madison, Wisconsin, along with Remington, while parent company Spectrum Brands was headquartered in Georgia. On April 15, 2010, Spectrum Brands announced that it would be moving its corporate headquarters back to Madison; Spectrum Brands moved its headquarters to the suburb of Middleton, Wisconsin, in October 2013.

Spectrum Brands finalized a merger with Russell Hobbs, Inc. on June 16, 2010, to form a new $3 billion consumer products company. Russell Hobbs' brands include George Foreman Grill, Toastmaster, Black & Decker Home appliances, and Russell Hobbs. In 2012, Spectrum also purchased many non-tool assets from Stanley Black & Decker, primarily hardware, plumbing, and locks. While the Russel Hobbs purchase brought Black & Decker licensing to Spectrum (for small appliances), the HHI purchase did not involve brands marketed under the Black & Decker name.

On April 28, 2015, Spectrum Brands entered the automotive supply business by acquiring Armored Auto group.

On January 16, 2018, the Rayovac division was bought by Energizer for $2 billion. On February 26, 2018, Spectrum Brands announced it was merging with controlling shareholder HRG Group, Inc. The move would not affect the pending sale of its battery division to Energizer. Spectrum management was expected to run the merged entity. The combined company is to be named Spectrum Brands Holdings, Inc. and trade under the ticker symbol SPB. The company will remain in Middleton.

In September 2021, Spectrum sold its Hardware and Home Improvement ("HHI") division to Assa Abloy for $4.3 billion. HHI has a varied portfolio of products, including patented SmartKey technology and electronic, smart and biometric locks. Key brands include Kwikset, Baldwin, Weiser, Pfister and National Hardware. HHI is headquartered in Lake Forest, California with some 7,500 employees worldwide and has manufacturing facilities in the United States, Mexico, Taiwan, China, and the Philippines.

== Battery products ==
Rayovac formerly manufactured alkaline batteries ranging in size from AAA to 9V, rechargeable nickel–metal hydride batteries, hearing aid batteries, lithium photo batteries, specialty batteries and portable power chargers. In addition, a variety of portable LED flashlights and lanterns are produced under the Rayovac brand, prior to its sale to Energizer Holdings. In November 2018, the company sold their global auto care division (brands which included Armor All, STP, and A/C Pro) to Energizer as well. Energizer continues to manufacture some battery products under the Rayovac brand.

== See also ==
- British Ever Ready Electrical Company
