= Hamster racing =

Sport in which hamsters race for fastest time

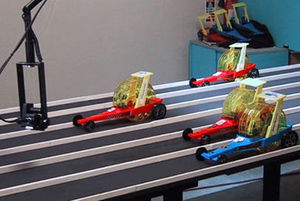
Standard-length Professional Hamster Racing track, outfitted with camera for TV or online broadcast

Hamster racing is a sport in which hamsters are placed in hamster wheels or hamster balls – often fitted to miniature racing vehicles – and raced down a straight 9 meter (30 ft) course. The hamster crossing the finish line in the shortest amount of time wins. According to a 2001 media report, the world-record time for this course setup is 38 seconds.

Events may feature as few as two hamsters or many teams of hamsters and human pit crews. Hamster balls may be simple spheres or feature many design modifications purported to increase the performance and style of the race vehicle.

== Professional racing ==
In 2001, an epidemic of foot and mouth disease caused the cancellation of some British horse races and other sporting events. To boost their lagging bookmaking incomes, betting agencies introduced and promoted the concept of professional hamster racing. Online bookmaker Blue Square organized the first hamster racing series, with the rodents racing in hamster dragsters. A series of qualifying rounds were held over a week, with a final race. The event was webcast live on the internet.

While largely confined to the United Kingdom, professional hamster racing has since made inroads in the United States and Asia.

Race hamsters are almost always divided into at least two race classes, which follow their species classifications: dwarfs and Syrians. They are also often divided into other race classes, such as novice, patterned and long-hair or short-hair.

Not all hamster racing is done professionally or for betting purposes. Amateur hamster races are popular at church outings and frequently occur at hamster and rodent shows. Amateur races generally do not conform to the professional 9 meter (30 ft) track distance but may use shorter "sprint" tracks designed to make sure all hamsters finish in a reasonable time. Fast hamsters are capable of winning sprint races in just a few seconds.

== Sponsorship ==
Petco

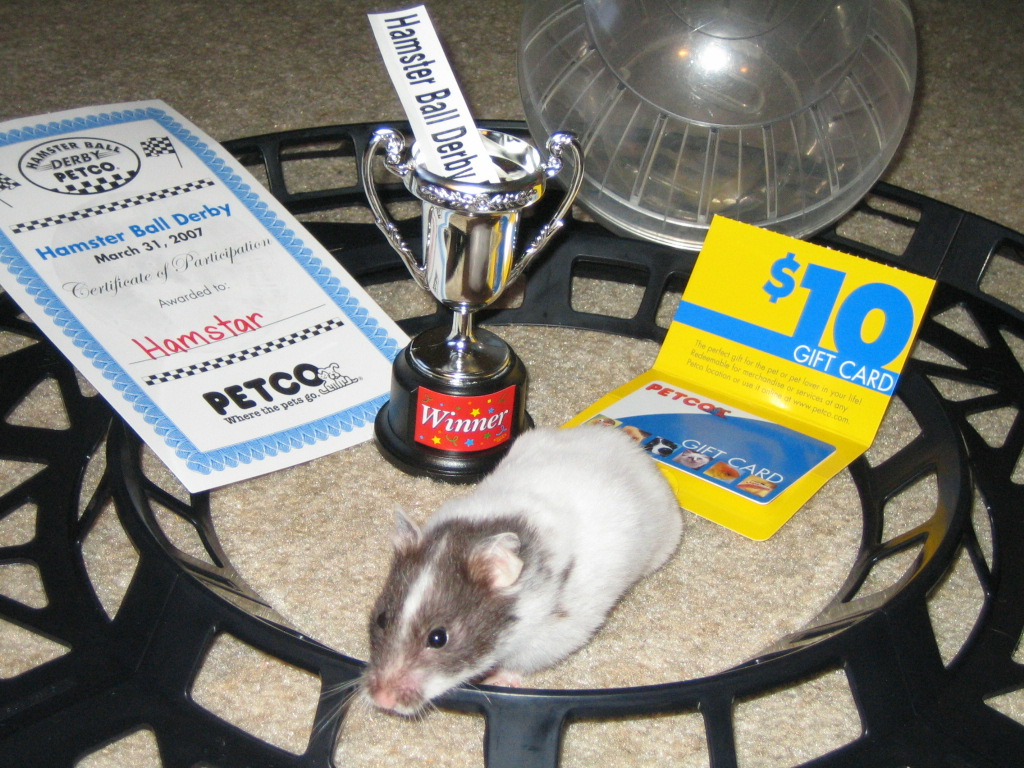
"Ham*Star," the winner of Petco's March 2007 San Diego Regional Hamster Ball Derby, with her prizes

In early 2007, Petco announced the return of biannual hamster races in all of its stores. The event is branded the "Petco Hamster Ball Derby" and takes place in late March and early September of each year. The 2006 races featured more than 14,000 amateur race hamsters and their owners in Petco stores across the country.

Petco uses a nonstandard short 8-foot (2.4 m) track and hamsters run in common spherical balls rather than the elaborate "drag racers" that professional race hamsters often use (see MTV Sponsorship infra). Races usually only last a few seconds due to the length of the track. Winners receive various prizes such as gift cards, training equipment and hamster treats.

MTV

In May 2006 MTV began promotion of "HamTrak '06," a world tour of professional hamster racers featuring hamster teams sponsored by The Sun, XFM, Pimp My Ride and others.

The first HamTrak race, held on May 19, 2006, at the Hammywood Hills Rodent Raceway, was won by the New Media Age sponsored "Team Hot Rodent," powered by the eight-month-old female Syrian hamster Michelle Schuhamster. It was her 24th career win.
