= Science Diet =

Pet food brand

Hill's Science Diet
- Company type: Public
- Industry: Pet food
- Founded: Topeka, Kansas (1960s)
- Headquarters: Topeka, Kansas, United States
- Area served: Worldwide
- Products: Dog food, Cat food
- Owner: Colgate-Palmolive
- Website: hillspet.com

Science Diet is a brand of cat and dog foods marketed by Hill's Pet Nutrition, Inc. (a subsidiary of the Colgate-Palmolive Company). In the United Kingdom and Europe, Science Diet operates as Science Plan.

== History ==
Science Diet was developed in the 1960s by Mark L. Morris Jr. PhD DVM (February 3, 1934 – January 14, 2007). Dr. Morris Jr. was the son of veterinarian Dr. Mark Morris Sr. DVM, who pioneered the field of veterinary clinical nutrition after being asked to formulate a specialized diet for the original seeing-eye dog, Buddy, a female German Shepherd with kidney disease. That success led Dr. Morris Sr. and his son to devise additional condition-specific and life-stage pet food formulas under the Prescription Diet and Science Diet brand names.

The Hill's Science Diet and Hill's Prescription Diet brands steadily gained market share, peaking in 2008 at 10.7% of dog food sales, but by 2011, this had dropped to 9.4% with shifts in consumer preferences toward pet foods marketed as "natural" and consumer perceptions of Science Diet as being "artificial".

== Recalls ==
Science Diet has had multiple product recalls.

- March 16, 2007 & March 27, 2017 — FDA Recall on Science Diet Savory Cuts canned cat food due to "melamine contamination" (chemical used in plastics manufacture)
- April 1, 2007 — Manufactured Recall on Prescription Diet m/d Feline dry cat food due to "melamine contamination" (chemical used in plastics manufacture)
- June 2, 2014 — FDA Recall for Science Diet Adult Small & Toy Breed dry dog food products for potential "salmonella contamination" regarding 62 bags in total. This was limited to the following states: California, Hawaii and Nevada.
- November 28, 2015 — Manufactured Recall due to "Labelling problems" on Adult Perfect Weight Chicken and Vegetables, Small & Toy Adult Gourmet Beef Entrée, Small & Toy Mature Gourmet Beef Entrée, Adult Beef Entrée, Adult Beef & Chicken Entrée, and Mature Adult Gourmet Beef Entree.
- January 31, 2019 — Manufactured Recall on Hill's Prescription dog food as well as wet Science Diet for "Elevated levels of vitamin D"
