= Menu Foods =

Canadian pet food company

Menu Foods Limited
- Type: Public
- Traded as: TSX: MEW
- Industry: Farm Products
- Defunct: 2010
- Fate: Acquired by Simmons Foods
- Headquarters: Mississauga, Ontario, Canada
- Key people: Paul K. Henderson
- Number of employees: 661
- Website: www.menufoods.com

Menu Foods Limited, based in Streetsville in Mississauga, Ontario, Canada, was the largest maker of wet cat and dog food in North America, with its products sold under 95 brand names, which the company identifies as supermarkets, big box and pet product retailers and wholesalers. It was bought out by Simmons Foods in August 2010.

In March 2007, after numerous animals fell ill and died during quality-control tests, the company recalled over 60 million containers of food. Subsequent to the recall, the Animal Health Laboratory at the University of Guelph in Ontario, identified contaminants in some of the recalled food: aminopterin, melamine, and cyanuric acid. If consumed by themselves, isolated doses of melamine or cyanuric acid should not cause health issues in pets. However, when these two chemicals are mixed together, an insoluble crystal is formed, that can rapidly obstruct the kidneys and cause kidney failure. The incident has been labelled "one of the largest consumer-product recalls in North American history".

== Company structure ==
In 2002, Menu Foods Limited and Menu Foods Operating Limited Partnership were owned by Menu Foods Limited Partnership. In turn, the Menu Foods Income Fund had 72 per cent share in Menu Foods Limited Partnership.

== Overview ==
Menu Foods manufactures both low cost and high end pet food products. It manufactures pet food for 17 of the top 20 North American retailers, including PetSmart, Safeway, Wal-Mart, Pet Valu, Kroger, and Ahold USA. It is also a contract manufacturer of branded pet food products, manufacturing for five of the top six branded companies in North America, including Procter & Gamble, for which it is the exclusive supplier of canned wet pet food sold under the Iams brand, P&G having sold its South Dakota plant to Menu Foods in 2003. Menu Foods also produces Loblaws' President's Choice, A&P's Master Choice, Sobeys's Compliments, Safeway's Select, Eukanuba, and Nutro.

Menu's production facilities are located in Emporia, Kansas; Pennsauken, New Jersey; and Streetsville, Ontario. The plants produce wet pet food in aluminum and steel cans at a rate of 1,000 cans per minute, or 1,110 85-gram pouches per minute. Jointly, the plants are able to produce over one billion containers a year.

Paul Henderson serves as President and Chief Executive Officer of Menu Foods. Mark Wiens is Executive Vice-President and Chief Financial Officer.

=== Store-brand cat food retailers ===
The following is a partial list of retailers that sell or sold store-brand cat food manufactured by Menu Foods. (The source material was revised and as of 2 May 2007 no longer lists retailers, only brands. A similar list existed for dog food.)

- A&P Supermarkets (The Great Atlantic & Pacific Tea Company)
- DeMoulas' Market Basket
- Food Lion
- Foodtown
- Hannaford
- H-E-B (As Hill Country Fare)
- Hy-Vee
- Kroger (As President's Choice)
- Loblaws
- Meijer
- PetSmart
- Price Chopper
- Safeway Inc.
- Save-A-Lot
- Sobeys
- Wal-Mart (As Ol'Roy and Special Kitty)
- Wegmans
- Winn-Dixie

== Recall ==
The Associated Press reported on March 16, 2007, that Menu was recalling dog food sold under 53 brands, and cat food sold under 42 brands, after an unknown number of animals suffered kidney failure after eating it. Chief Executive and President Paul Henderson said the company had received an undisclosed number of complaints that pets were vomiting and suffering kidney failure. At least 471 cases of poisoning have been reported and 104 animals have died.
