= Hill's Pet Nutrition =

Pet food company

Hill's Pet Nutrition, Inc.
- Formerly: Hill Rendering Works
- Company type: Subsidiary
- Industry: Manufacturing
- Genre: Pet food
- Founded: 1907
- Founder: Burton Hill
- Headquarters: Overland Park, Kansas, United States
- Area served: Worldwide
- Key people: Burton Hill; Mark Morris Sr.; Mark Morris Jr.
- Products: Cat food Dog food
- Brands: Prescription Diet; Science Diet
- Revenue: $3.71 billion
- Parent: Colgate-Palmolive
- Website: www.hillspet.com

Hill's Pet Nutrition, Inc., trading as Hill's, is an American pet food company that produces dog and cat foods. It is a subsidiary of Colgate-Palmolive.

== History ==
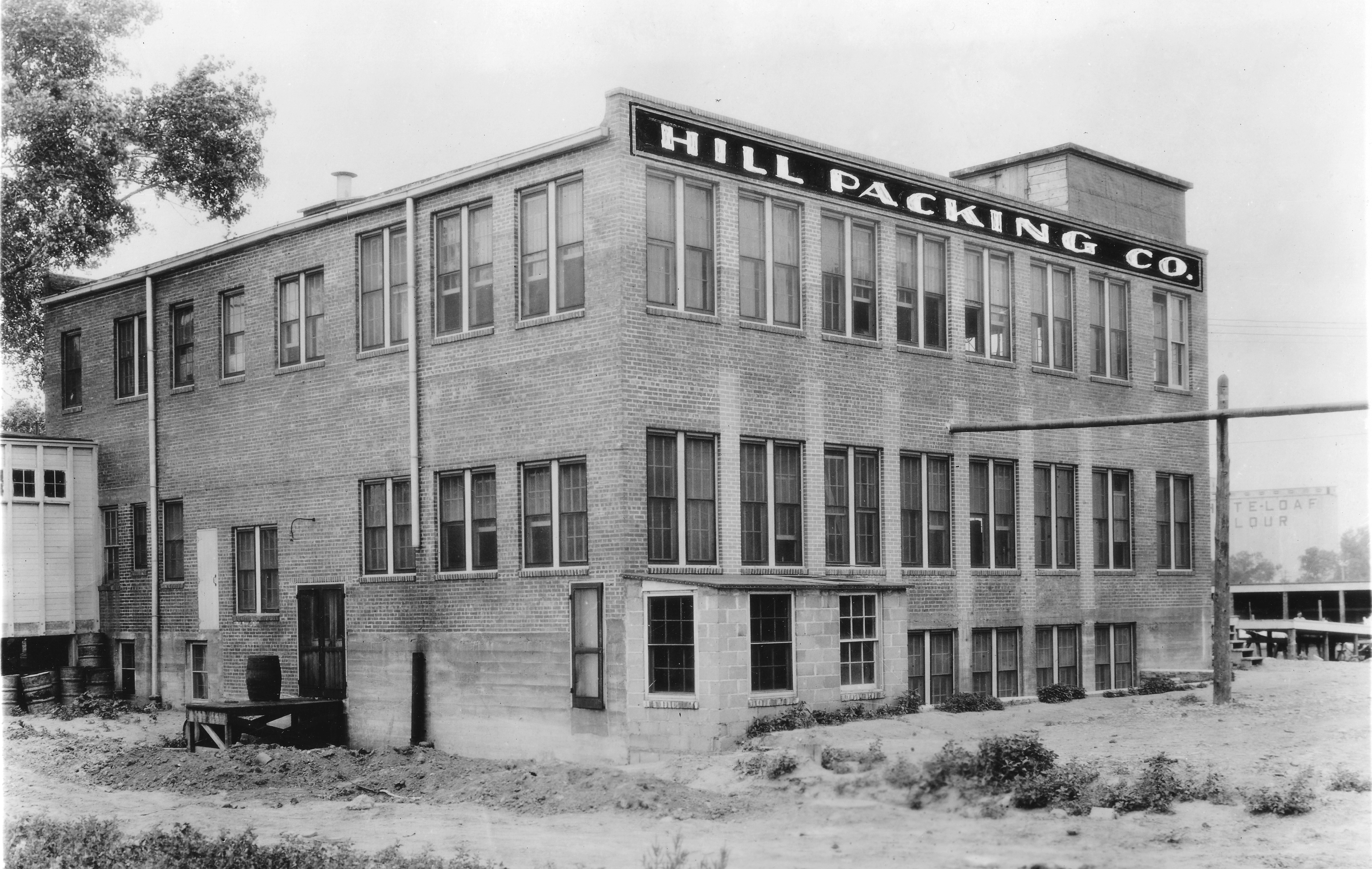
Early picture of Hill Packing Company

Hill's Pet Nutrition was founded in the spring of 1907 by Burton Hill and started operation as Hill Rendering Works. Hill Rendering Works provided rendering services to Shawnee County, Kansas, and had a contract with Topeka, Kansas, to dispose of dead and lame animals. Hill Rendering Works produced tallow, hides, tankage, meat scraps and farm animal feed including hogs and chicken feed.

By the 1930s, the name had changed to Hill Packing Company, which included a milling division, Hill Milling company. At this time the company produced farm animal feed, dog food and horse meat for human consumption, processing 500 head of horse per week. The meat was shipped to markets in Norway, Sweden, Finland and the Netherlands. Much of the horse meat was sold to the east coast as a product called Chopped and Cured and shipped to Europe as barreled horse loins.

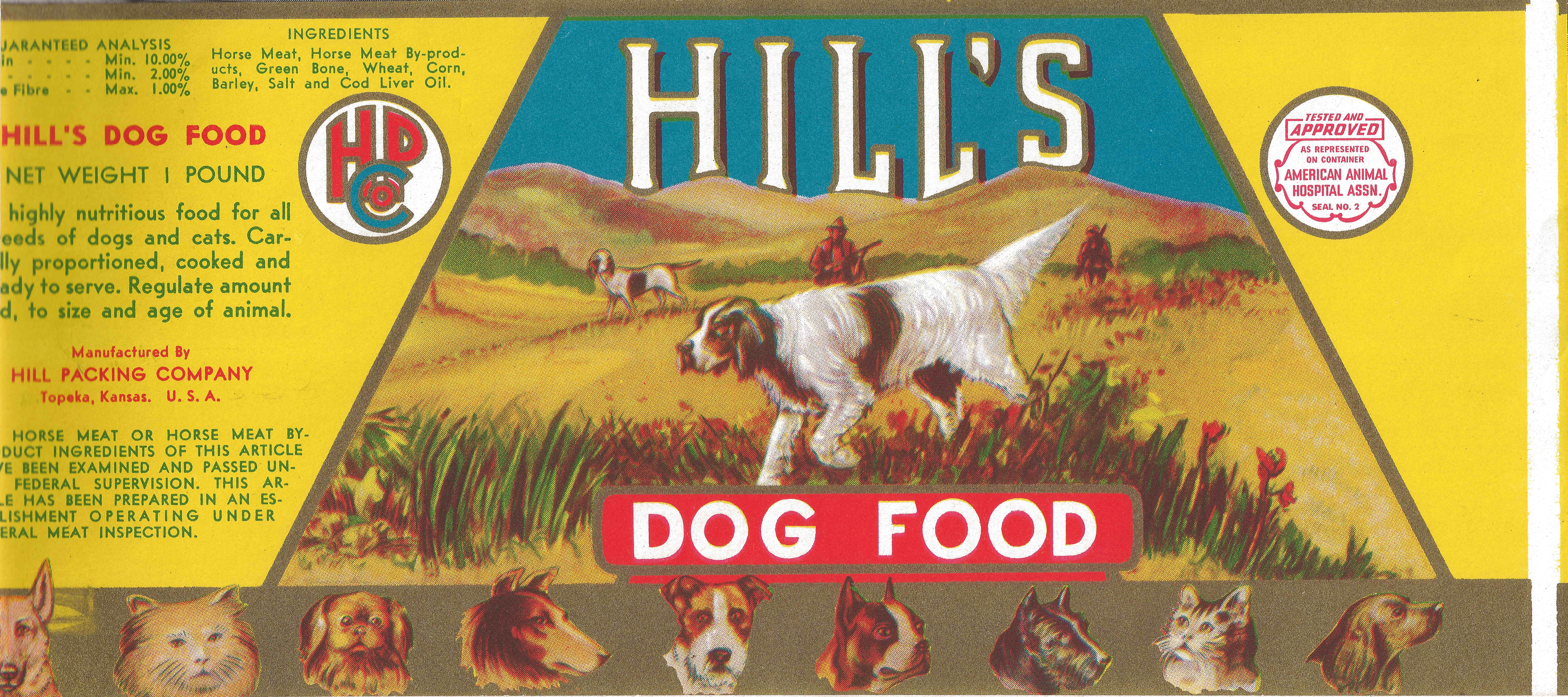
Hill's Dog Food can label

In 1948, Mark L. Morris contacted Hill Packing Company to produce Canine k/d. Hill Packing Company became the license producer of Canine k/d. In 1968, the food line was made available through veterinarians and pet professionals as Hill's Science Diet. The line continued to expand and includes more than 60 Prescription Diet brand pet foods (prescription foods for cats and dogs with specific diseases, only available through a vet or pet pharmacy) and Science Diet brand pet foods (sold through veterinarians and pet specialty stores). In 1968, Hill Packing Company was sold to Riviana Foods, then in 1976 Colgate-Palmolive merged with Riviana Foods.

In 2025, the company announced that it had surpassed 16 million pet adoptions in North America through its Food, Shelter & Love program.

== Product brands ==
=== Science Diet ===
Science Diet was developed in the 1960s by Mark L. Morris Jr. (1934 – 2007). Morris was the son of veterinarian Dr. Mark Morris Sr., who pioneered the field of veterinary clinical nutrition when asked to create a specialized diet for the original seeing-eye dog, Buddy, a female German Shepherd with kidney disease. That success led Morris and his son to create additional condition-specific and life-stage pet food formulas under the Prescription Diet and Science Diet brand names.

=== Prescription Diet ===
Prescription Diet is a line of pet food formulated to help cats and dogs with health issues.

== Recalls ==
One Prescription Diet line and five products of the Science Diet line were involved in the 2007 pet food recalls for their inclusion of melamine tainted wheat gluten received from China.

On January 31, 2019, Hill's recalled 25 varieties of its canned dog food, because of elevated levels of vitamin D, due to a supplier error. Vitamin D overdose in animals can cause irreversible kidney damage and eventually death. On February 12, 2019, San Francisco law firm Schubert Jonckheer & Kolbe filed a class action lawsuit in the United States District Court for the Northern District of California against Hill's on behalf of affected owners for distributing dog food which contained potentially toxic levels of vitamin D.
