= Iams =

Brand of cat and dog food

- Product type: Pet food
- Current owner: Mars, Incorporated (In specific countries); Spectrum Brands (Europe only)
- Country: United States
- Introduced: 1946; 80 years ago
- Markets: Worldwide
- Website: iams.com (US) iams.eu (EU)

Iams (/ˈaɪəmz/) is an American brand of dog food and cat food manufactured by Spectrum Brands in Europe and Mars, Incorporated worldwide excluding Europe. The food is formulated for the puppy/kitten, adult and mature stages of life. Veterinary formulas for pets with special dietary requirements are also produced.

== History ==
During the 1940s, because pet food was not available in stores, animals were predominantly fed homemade food, usually table scraps. Paul Iams, an animal nutritionist who graduated from the Ohio State University in 1937, founded the Iams Company in 1946 in a small feed mill near Dayton, Ohio. In the 1950s, he developed the world's first animal-based protein dry dog food and called it Iams 999.

During the 1973 Arab oil embargo, the cost of meat and bone meal tripled, while sale prices in the U.S. were frozen under Phase I of President Richard Nixon's Economic Stabilization Program. Iams did not change its product formula during this period, and the company nearly went bankrupt as a result. Clay Mathile, who had joined Iams in 1970, purchased half of the company in 1975. In 1982, he became its sole owner and president. Having increased company revenue from $100,000 in 1970 to $900 million in 1999, Mathile sold Iams to Procter & Gamble in September 1999.

In its largest divestiture in five years, Procter & Gamble announced in April 2014 that it would sell the Iams, Eukanuba, and Natura pet-food brands in all markets except Europe to Mars, Inc. for $2.9 billion in cash. Mars said that the deal would allow it to gain a new business and generate cash to grow core businesses. The deal for P&G Pet Care's operations in North America and Latin America was completed in August 2014. P&G also exercised options to acquire Mars's pet-food business in some parts of Asia Pacific, Middle East and Africa, including Australia, Japan and Singapore. Procter & Gamble sold its European pet-care business to Spectrum Brands in December 2014.

In 2025, the company launched an awareness campaign addressing feline obesity, featuring the fictional character Garfield.
