= Pet food =

Animal feed for pets

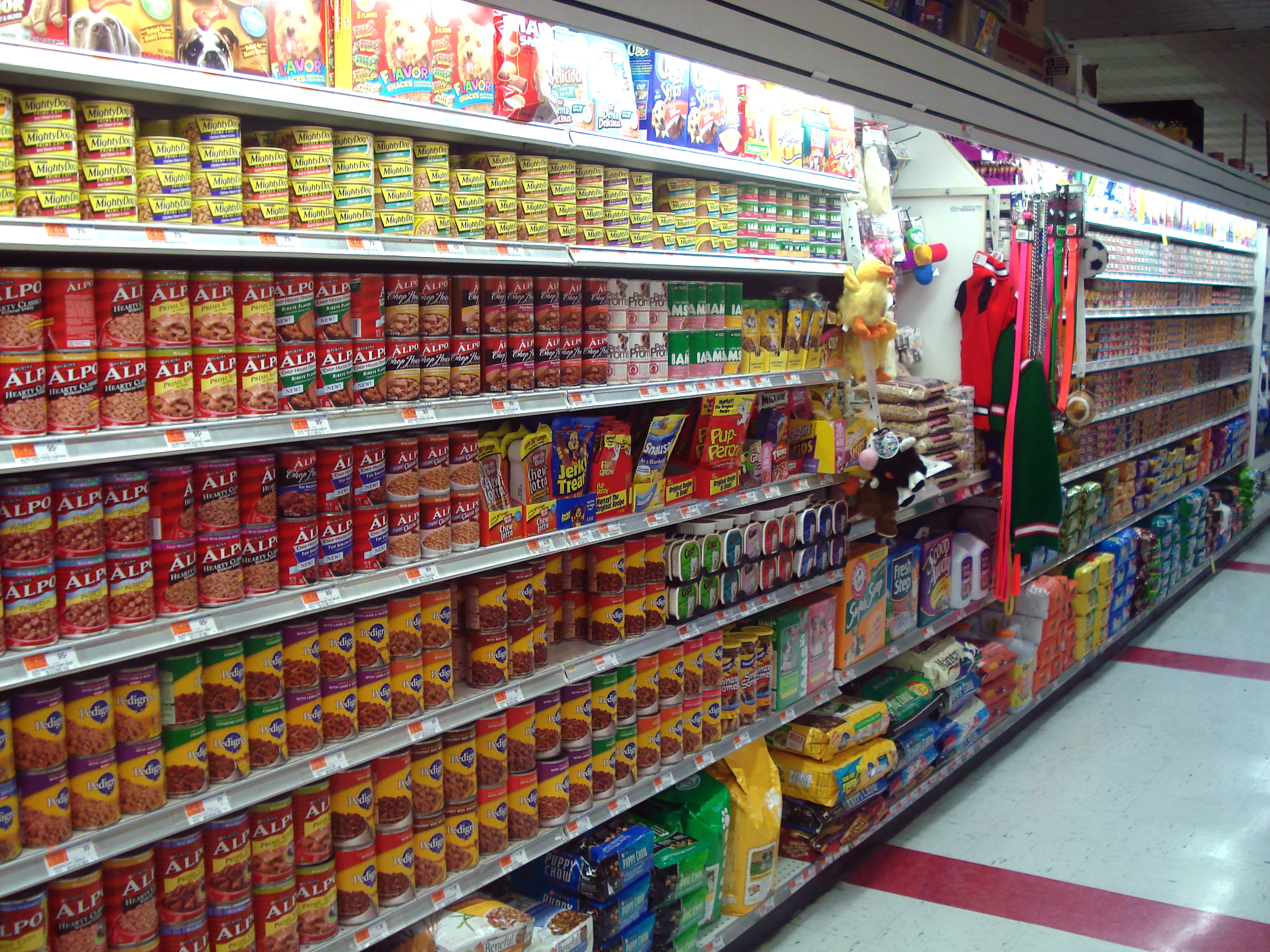
A supermarket's pet food aisle in Brooklyn, New York

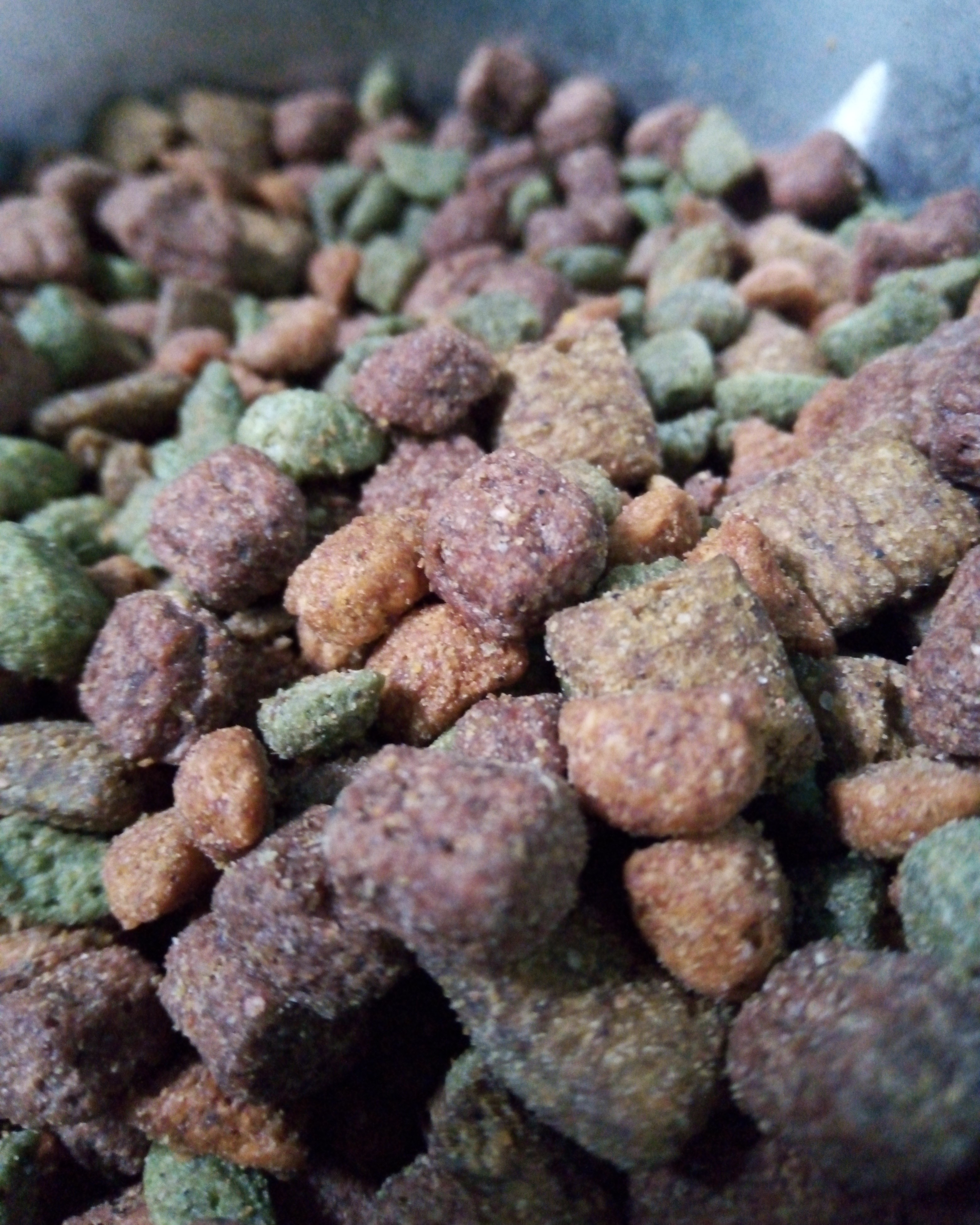
Cat food in a bowl.

Pet food is animal feed intended for consumption by pets. Typically sold in pet stores and supermarkets, it is usually specific to the type of animal, such as dog food or cat food. Most meat used for animals is a byproduct of the human food industry, and is not regarded as "human grade". Examples of foods for pets would be canned foods and dry mix. Pet food production has environmental, land-use and climate change impacts.

In 2019, the world pet food market was valued at US$87.09 billion and is projected to grow to US$113.2 billion by the year 2024. The pet food market is dominated by five major companies, as of 2020: Mars, Inc., Nestle Purina Petcare, J. M. Smucker, Hill's Pet Nutrition, Inc. (owned by Colgate-Palmolive), and Blue Buffalo Co. Ltd (owned by General Mills).

== Industry ==
In the United States, pet-food sales in 2016 reached an all-time high of $28.23 billion. Mars is the leading company in the pet food industry, making about $17 billion annually in pet-care products. Online sales of pet food are increasing and contributing to this growth. Online sales in the US increased 15 percent in 2015. Worldwide, the compound annual growth rate of pet food purchased online was more than 25% between 2013 and 2018. As of 2015, the U.S. leads the world in pet-food spending.

== Impact and sustainability ==
As of 2018, there are around 470 million pet dogs and around 370 million pet cats. Given the carnivorous diets fed to many pets (especially cats and dogs), involving the consumption of an estimated fifth of the world's meat and fish, the impact of pet-food production on climate change, land-use and other environmental impacts becomes an issue. Pet food production is responsible for 20–30% of the environmental impacts from animal production. It has been estimated that global greenhouse gas emissions from dog and cat dry food represents around 1.1%−2.9% of global emissions, an amount close to the total emissions of countries such as Mozambique or the Philippines.

Like humans, dogs are omnivores. There is research on alternative protein sources for pet food including insects and algae. Although cats are obligate carnivores, they digest plant proteins well.

A life-cycle analysis of contemporary pet foods suggests wet foods for cats and dogs tend to have a larger impact than dry foods. It also suggests there are substantial opportunities for improvement in "all phases of the pet food life cycle, including formulation, ingredient selection, manufacturing processes" and so on.

== Fish food ==
Fish foods normally contain macronutrients, trace elements and vitamins necessary to keep captive fish in good health. Approximately 80% of fishkeeping hobbyists feed their fish exclusively prepared foods that most commonly are produced in flake, pellet or tablet form. Pelleted forms, some of which sink rapidly, are often used for larger fish or bottom-feeding species such as loaches or catfish. Some fish foods also contain additives, such as beta carotene or sex hormones, to artificially enhance the color of ornamental fish.

== Bird food ==
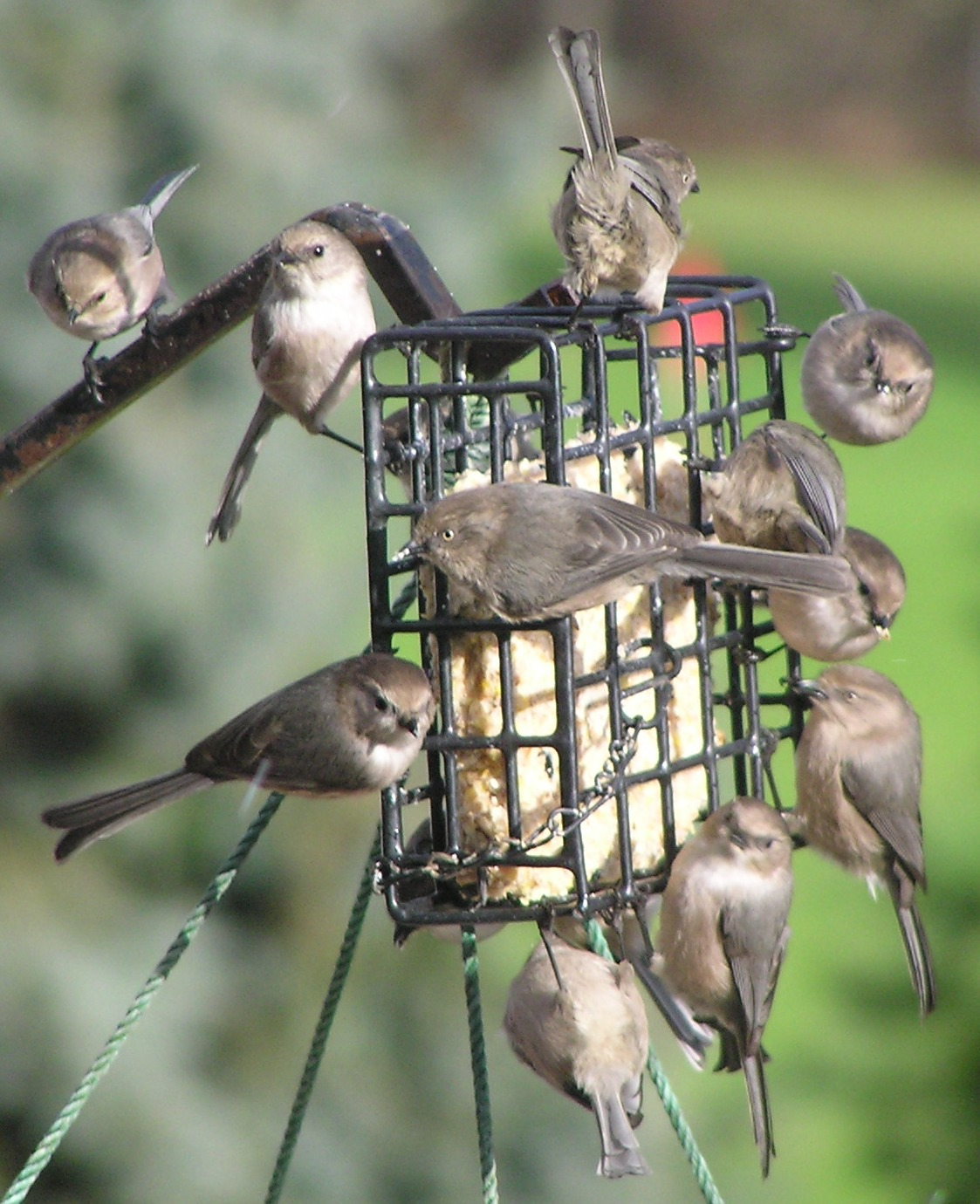
Bushtits eating suet from a bird feeder

Bird foods are used both in birdfeeders and to feed pet birds. It typically consist of a variety of seeds. However, not all birds eat seeds. Nectar (essentially sugar water) attracts hummingbirds.

== Carnivoran pets ==
=== Cat food ===
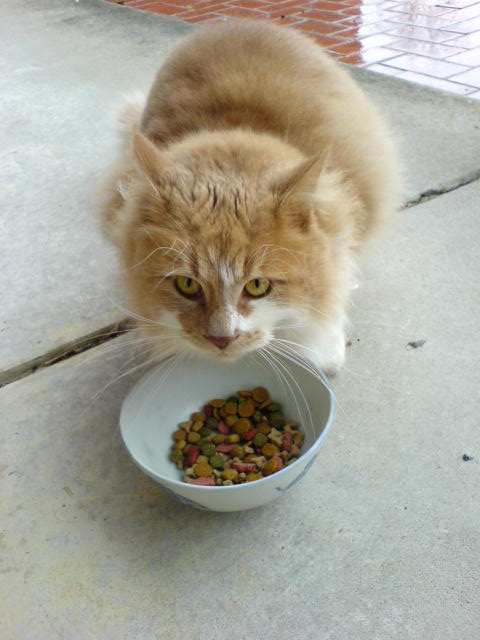
Cat with a bowl of pelleted cat food

Cats are obligate carnivores, which means that they have a nutritional requirement for nutrients that are only naturally found in meat. Cat food is formulated to address the specific nutritional requirements of cats, in particular containing the amino acid taurine, as cats cannot thrive on taurine-deficient food. Optimal levels of taurine for cat food have been established by the Waltham Centre for Pet Nutrition. Modern standards such as those established by the AAFCO specify not only taurine amounts, but also amounts of every essential nutrient.

Most commercial cat food contains both animal and plant material supplemented with vitamins, minerals and other nutrients. Cats absorb plant proteins quite well: their protein absorption is increased when half of their protein intake is switched to a plant-based source.

=== Dog food ===
Recommendations differ on what diet is best for dogs. Some people argue dogs have thrived on leftovers and scraps from their human owners for thousands of years, and commercial dog foods (which have only been available for the past century) contain poor-quality meats, additives, and other ingredients dogs should not ingest, or that commercial dog food is not nutritionally sufficient for their dogs. Many commercial brands are formulated using insights gained from scientific nutritional studies.

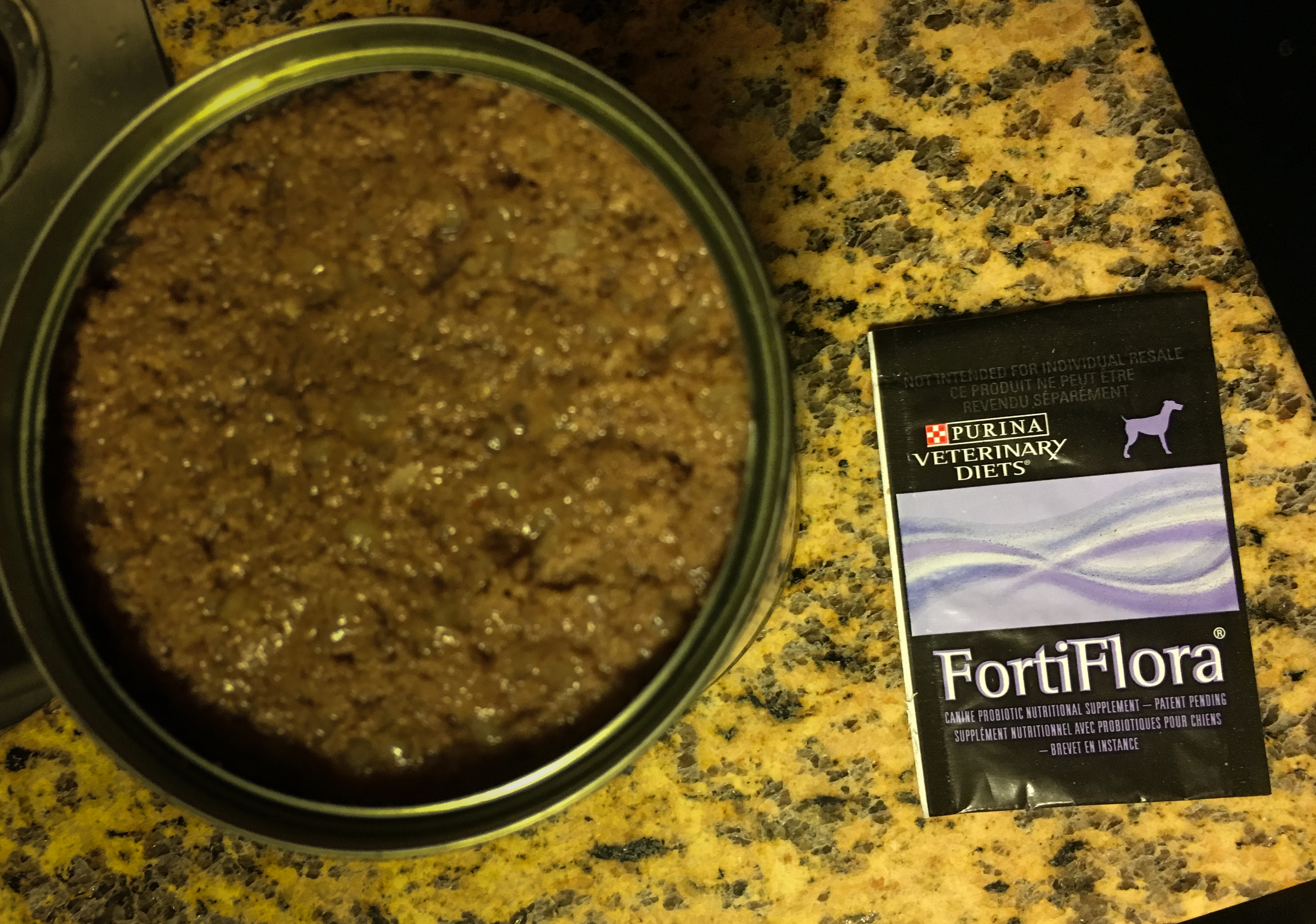
FortiFlora Dog Probiotics canned wet dog food

Many dog food manufacturers refer to AAFCO standards to ensure the safety of their dog food. AAFCO is a collaborative organization involving feed control officers and regulatory authorities from the United States and Canada. It plays an important role in ensuring the safety and quality of pet food and animal feed, providing reliable standards for the entire industry. However, AAFCO itself does not have the authority to create laws. Instead, its standards serve as the basis for individual states, regions, and federal governments in the U.S. and Canada to establish and enforce laws and regulations regarding pet food.

Additionally, based on the recommended nutritional guidelines for dog food and cat food that AAFCO published in 1993, nutritional standards have been set for different life stages (growth stage for puppies and maintenance stage for adult dogs). Many dog food manufacturers now refer to these standards. The latest AAFCO standard was published in 2013.

== Raw feeding ==
Raw feeding is the practice of feeding domestic dogs, cats and other animals a diet consisting primarily of uncooked meat, edible bones, and organs. The ingredients used to formulate raw diets can vary. Some pet owners choose to make home-made raw diets to feed their animals, but commercial raw food diets are also available. Veterinary associations such as the American Veterinary Medical Association, British Veterinary Association and Canadian Veterinary Medical Association have warned of the animal and public health risk that could arise from feeding raw meat to pets and have stated that there is no scientific evidence to support the claimed benefits of raw feeding.

The practice of feeding raw diets has raised some concerns due to the risk of food borne illnesses, zoonosis and nutritional imbalances. People who feed their dogs raw food do so for a multitude of reasons, including but not limited to: culture, beliefs surrounding health, nutrition and what is perceived to be more natural for their pets. Feeding raw food can be perceived by owners as allowing the pet to stay in touch with their wild, carnivorous ancestry. The raw food movement has occurred in parallel to the change in human food trends for more natural and organic products.

In some cases, raw food have added preservatives to extend their shelf life. One preservative used, sulfur dioxide (E220), destroys thiamine in meat and sometimes other food eaten with meat. This has led to at least three clusters of thiamine deficiency in Australian cats and dogs. Sulfites (E221–E229) also rapidly release sulfur dioxide. In addition, sulfur dioxide does not prevent the spoilage of meat, but only delays the appearance of signs of spoilage (malodor and color changing from pink to brown). As of 2005, there is no law in New South Wales mandating that all preservatives be listed on "pet mince" and "food rolls". All reports of this issue on PubMed are from Australia.

== Foods which may be toxic to animals ==
Prepared foods and some raw ingredients may be toxic for animals, and care should be taken when feeding animals leftover food. It is known that the following foods are potentially unsafe for cats, dogs and pigs:

- Chocolate, coffee-based products and caffeinated soft drinks (methylxanthine alkaloids) in dogs and cats
- Raisins and grapes in dogs. Reliable sources such as the ASPCA do not list them as toxic to cats.
- Macadamia nuts in dogs
- Garlic (in large doses) and onions (Allium) in dogs and cats
- Alcohol in all species
- Lilies in cats
- Xylitol, an alternative sweetener found in chewing gum and baked goods designed for diabetics, is highly toxic to dogs and ferrets. Some sources, not reliable ones such as ASPCA, claim that it is toxic to cats.

Generally, cooked and marinated foods should be avoided, as well as sauces and gravies, which may contain ingredients that may be toxic to animals.

== Labeling and regulation ==
=== United States ===
In the United States and its associated territories, all pet food is regulated by the Food and Drug Administration (FDA), the United States Department of Agriculture (USDA), and the Federal Trade Commission (FTC). It is further regulated at the state level. State Department of Agriculture officials, major feed manufacturers, and ingredient suppliers form the Association of American Feed Control Officials (AAFCO), a non-government agency that establishes guidelines and standards on feed laws and regulations. Although government officials do comprise a large portion of AAFCO, it has no regulatory authority and acts simply as an advisory body, working closely with the FDA to develop standards that food consumed by animals must meet. AAFCO leaves the responsibility of regulating these standards to the individual states. Most states have adopted the guidelines set forth by AAFCO.

The "Family Rule" allows a manufacturer to have a product that is "nutritionally similar" to another product in the same "family" to adopt the latter's "complete and balanced" statement without itself undergoing any feeding tests. The "similar" food must be of the same processing type; contain the same moisture content; bear a statement of nutritional adequacy for the same or less demanding life stage as the lead product; contain a dry matter, metabolizable energy (ME) content within 7.5% of the lead product's dry matter; meet the same levels of crude protein, calcium, phosphorus, zinc, lysine, thiamine (and for cat foods, potassium and taurine) as the lead food; and meet or exceed the nutrient levels and ratios of the lead family product or the AAFCO nutrient profiles, whichever is lower. The label statement on the similar food can be the same as the lead product if the ME is substantiated by the 10-day ME feeding study.

Critics of the AAFCO standards argue that such requirements are too lax. Generational studies conducted by researchers at University of California, Davis, have shown some foods that pass AAFCO's feeding trials are still not suitable for long-term use and estimated that of 100 foods that pass the nutritional analysis, 10 to 20 would not pass the feeding trials. Although maximum levels of intake of some nutrients have been established because of concerns with overnutrition, many still lack a maximum allowed level and some contains large disparity between maximum and minimum values. The NRC accepts that despite ongoing research, large gaps still exist in the knowledge of quantitative nutritional information for specific nutrients. Some professionals acknowledge the possibilities of phytochemicals and other vital nutrients that have yet to be recognized as essential by nutritional science. With such broad guidelines and loose feeding trial standards, critics argue that the term "complete and balanced" is inaccurate and even deceptive. An AAFCO panel expert has stated that "although the AAFCO profiles are better than nothing, they provide false securities."

Certain manufacturers label their products with terms such as premium, ultra premium, and holistic. Such terms currently have no official definitions. The AAFCO is currently considering defining some of the terms. However, the terms "natural" and "organic" do have definitions; e.g., organic products must meet the same USDA regulations as for organic human food.

=== Canada ===
In Canada, products that pass the Canadian Veterinary Medical Association (CVMA) Pet Food Certification Program, which involves a feeding trial, carry a CVMA label on their packaging. Participation in the program is voluntary. The program was discontinued at the end of 2007. There is no government regulation of pet food manufactured in Canada. However, imported pet food does receive stringent oversight.

=== European Union ===
In the European Union, pet food is regulated by the same harmonised standards across the EU, via the Feeding Stuffs Act.

All ingredients used for pet food have to be fit for human consumption according to EU requirements. But regulations require that pet food that contains by-products be labelled as "Not for human consumption" even though such by-products have to be derived from animals declared fit for human consumption. Raw pet food has to be labelled "Pet food only".

Products meant for daily feeding are labelled "complete feedingstuff" or "complete petfood" or other EU languages equivalent. Products meant for intermittent feeding are labeled "complementary feedingstuff or "complementary pet food" while products with an ash content of over 40% are labeled "mineral feedingstuff". Ingredients are listed in descending order by weight.

With the released Commission Regulation (EU) No 107/2013, the European Union has set new maximum levels for melamine in canned pet food. According to results of an in-depth research of the 2007 pet food crisis, melamine used in coatings for pet food cans can migrate into the food. Therefore, the regular melamine migration limit (SML) of 2.5 mg/kg for food and feed has been expanded to pet food. This limit is valid for canned wet pet food on an 'as sold' basis.

The European Union does not use a unified nutrient requirement. A manufacturer committee called FEDIAF (European Pet Food Industry Federation) makes recommendations for cats and dogs that members follow.

== 2007 recalls ==
Beginning in March 2007, there were massive recalls of many brands of cat and dog foods. The recalls came in response to reports of kidney failure in pets consuming mostly wet pet foods made with wheat gluten from a single Chinese company, beginning in February 2007. After more than three weeks of complaints from consumers, the recall began voluntarily with the Canadian company Menu Foods on March 16, 2007, when a company test showed sickness and death in some of the test animals. Soon after, there were numerous media reports of animal deaths as a result of kidney failure, and several other companies who received the contaminated wheat gluten also voluntarily recalled dozens of pet food brands. Menu Foods recalled almost over 50 brands of dog food, and over 40 brands of cat food. Nestlé Purina PetCare withdrew all sizes and varieties of Alpo "Prime Cuts in Gravy". Some companies were not affected and utilized the situation to generate sales for alternative pet foods.

== 2021 recalls ==
In early January 2021, Midwestern Pet Food products recalled its Sportmix products which were linked to the death of over 70 dogs and sickness in about 80 others. Dog and cat food, sold by retailers across the United States over the internet, were being investigated by the US Food and Drug Administration for the possibility that fatal levels of aflatoxins were present in the food. Midwestern, which is based in Evansville, Indiana, broadened its recall to include all its pet food products manufactured in its Oklahoma facility that contain corn and have expiration dates on or before July 9, 2022.

== See also ==
- Food safety
