= William Wrigley =

William Wrigley may refer to:

- William Wrigley Jr. (1861–1932), American founder of William Wrigley Jr. Company
- William Wrigley III (1933–1999), American confectionery magnate
- William Wrigley Jr. II (born 1963), American confectionery magnate

== See also ==
- Wrigley (disambiguation)
