= Wrigley =

Wrigley may refer to:

== Companies ==
- Wrigley Company, a chewing gum manufacturer
- EG Wrigley and Company, a British manufacturer of cars, car components and mechanical parts

== People ==
- Wrigley (surname), a list of people with the name

== Places ==
=== United States ===
- Wrigley, Long Beach, California, a group of neighborhoods
- Wrigley, Kentucky, an unincorporated community
- Wrigley, Tennessee, a census-designated place and unincorporated community

=== Elsewhere ===
- Wrigley, Northwest Territories, Canada, a community
  - Wrigley Airport
- Wrigley Brook, a culverted watercourse in Greater Manchester, England
- Wrigley Airfield, an American World War II airfield on Eniwetok Atoll
- Wrigley Bluffs, Queen Elizabeth Land, Antarctica
- Wrigley Gulf, Marie Byrd Land, Antarctica

== Sports ==
- Wrigley Field, a Major League Baseball ballpark in Chicago
- Wrigley Field (Los Angeles), a ballpark
- Wrigley National Midget Tournament, a former Canadian ice hockey tournament (1973–1978)
  - Wrigley Cup, former name of the Telus Cup, Canada's national under-18 ice hockey club championship
- Wrigley Trophy, an award given for motorboat racing in 1912

== Other uses ==
- USC Wrigley Institute for Environmental Studies, a University of Southern California research institute
- HBC Wrigley, a Hudson's Bay steamship built in 1885

== See also ==
- Wrigley Building, a skyscraper in Chicago, Illinois, United States
- Wrigley Lodge, Chicago, Illinois, a building owned by the Salvation Army
- Wrigley Botanical Gardens, Santa Catalina Island, California, United States
- Wrigley Mansion, Phoenix, Arizona, United States, on the National Register of Historic Places
