= William Wrigley Jr. Summer Cottage =

Historic house in California, United States

- U.S. National Register of Historic Places
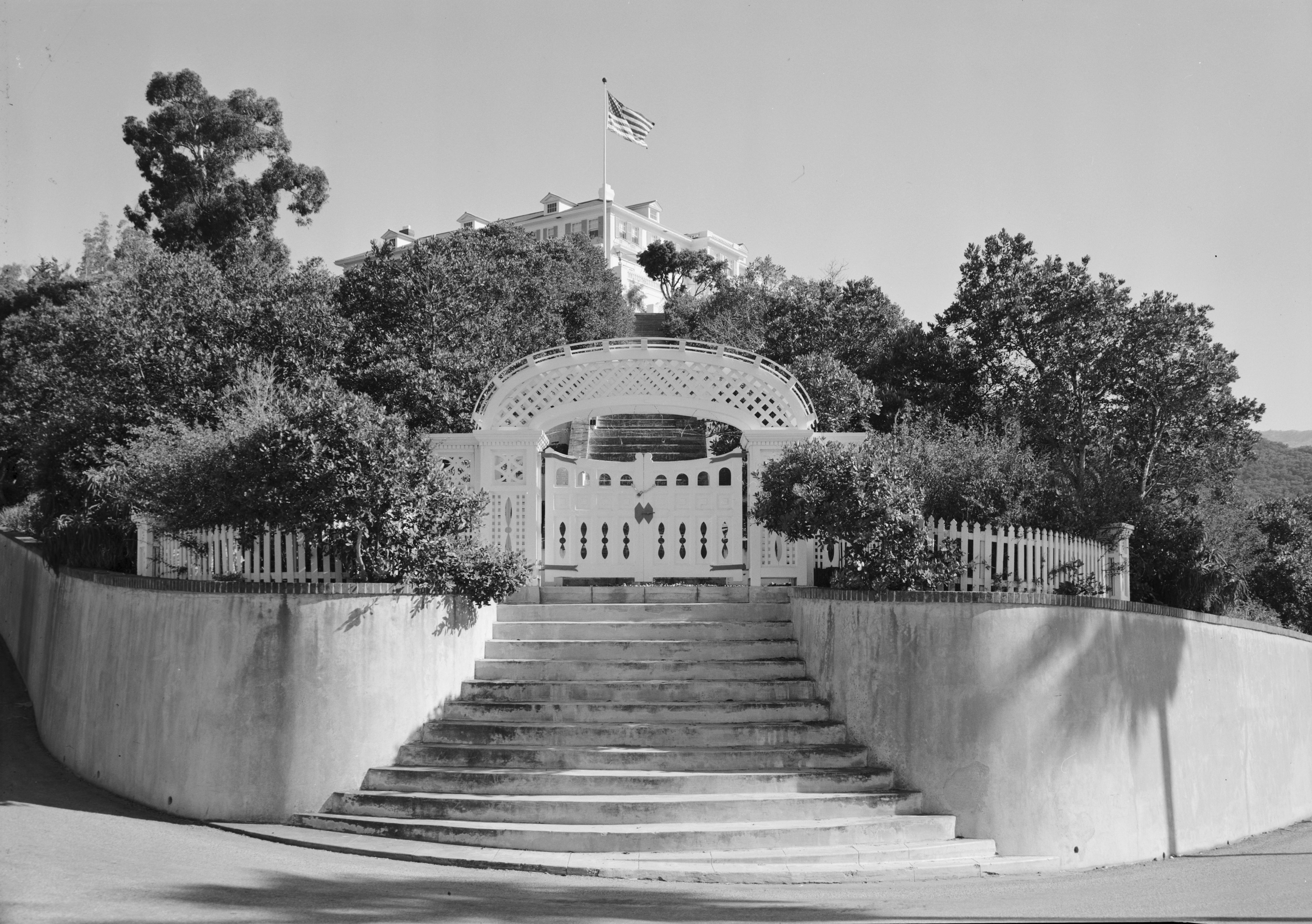

- Location within the Los Angeles metropolitan area Location within California Location within the United States
- Location: 76 Wrigley Rd., Avalon, California
- Coordinates: 33°20′28″N 118°19′13″W
- Area: 5 acres (2.0 ha)
- Built: 1921
- Architect: Davis, Zachary Taylor; Harris, Walter H.; Renton, David M.; Waddingham, A. B.
- Architectural style: Georgian Colonial Revival
- Website: https://www.visitcatalinaisland.com/lodging/avalon/mt-ada/
- NRHP reference No.: 85001785
- Added to NRHP: August 15, 1985

The William Wrigley Jr. Summer Cottage, or "Mount Ada", is a historic residence located at 76 Wrigley Road in Avalon, on Santa Catalina Island, California. It was the former summer mansion and gardens of William Wrigley Jr. (1861–1932), the founder of the Wrigley Company. It is on a hill, overlooking the town and Avalon Bay.

== History ==
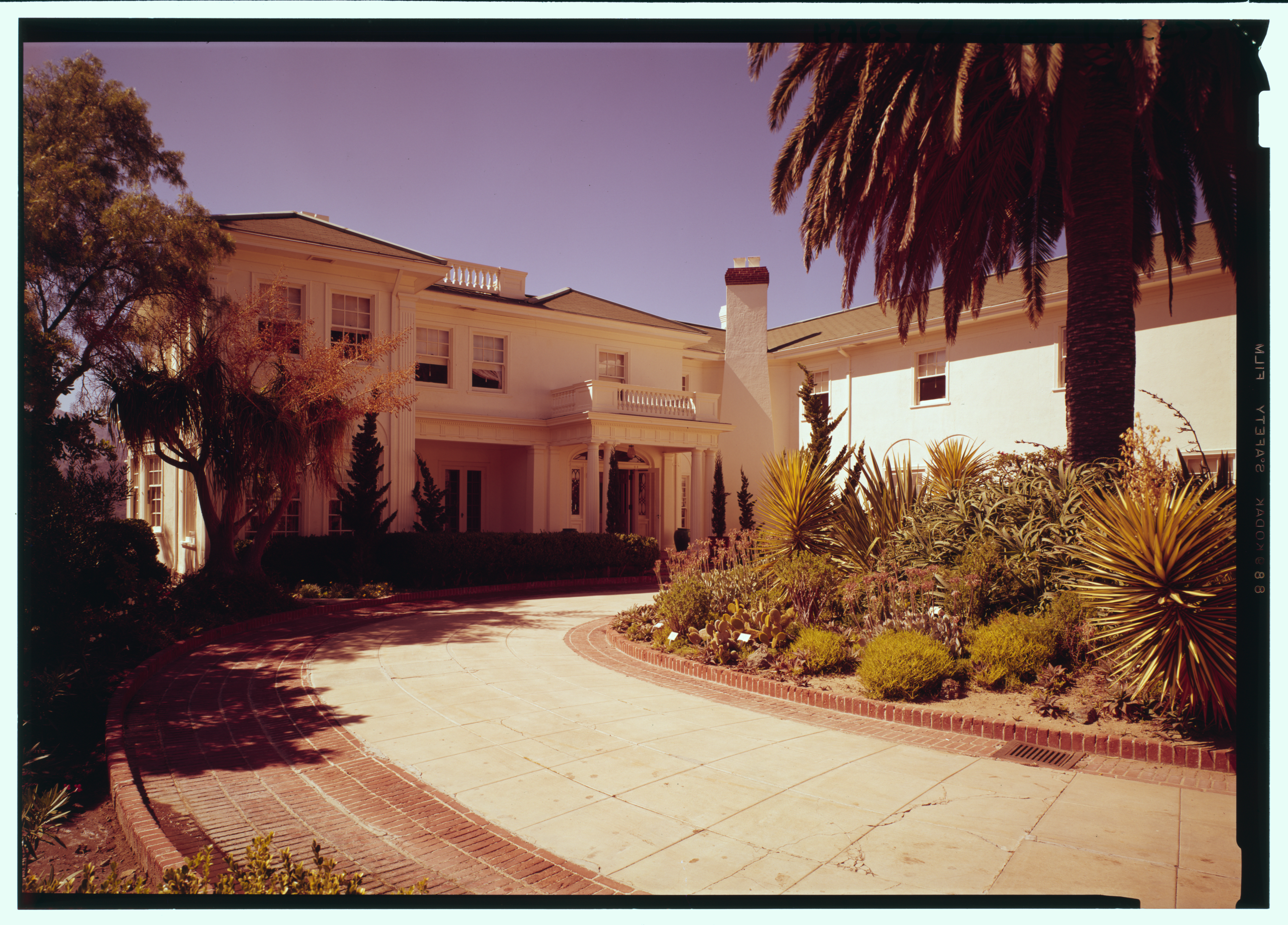
General view of south court elevation, 1974

The house was built in 1919–1921 as a summer retreat for the Wrigleys of Chicago, who owned 99% of Santa Catalina Island, one of the Channel Islands of California. It was designed in the Georgian Colonial Revival style by architect Zachary Taylor Davis, who had also designed Wrigley Field in Chicago, and would return to design Wrigley Field (Los Angeles) in 1925. The Wrigleys used it together until 1932, when Mr. Wrigley died.

Mrs. Wrigley then visited the house until 1947, when she retired to the Wrigley Mansion in Pasadena, California. In its heyday, the Wrigleys entertained Presidents Calvin Coolidge and Warren Harding, and the Prince of Wales at the house.

In the 1970s, it was donated to the University of Southern California, and it was used as a conference center.

It was listed on the National Register of Historic Places listings in Los Angeles County, California in 1985.

There is also a Wrigley Mansion in Phoenix, Arizona.

=== Hotel ===
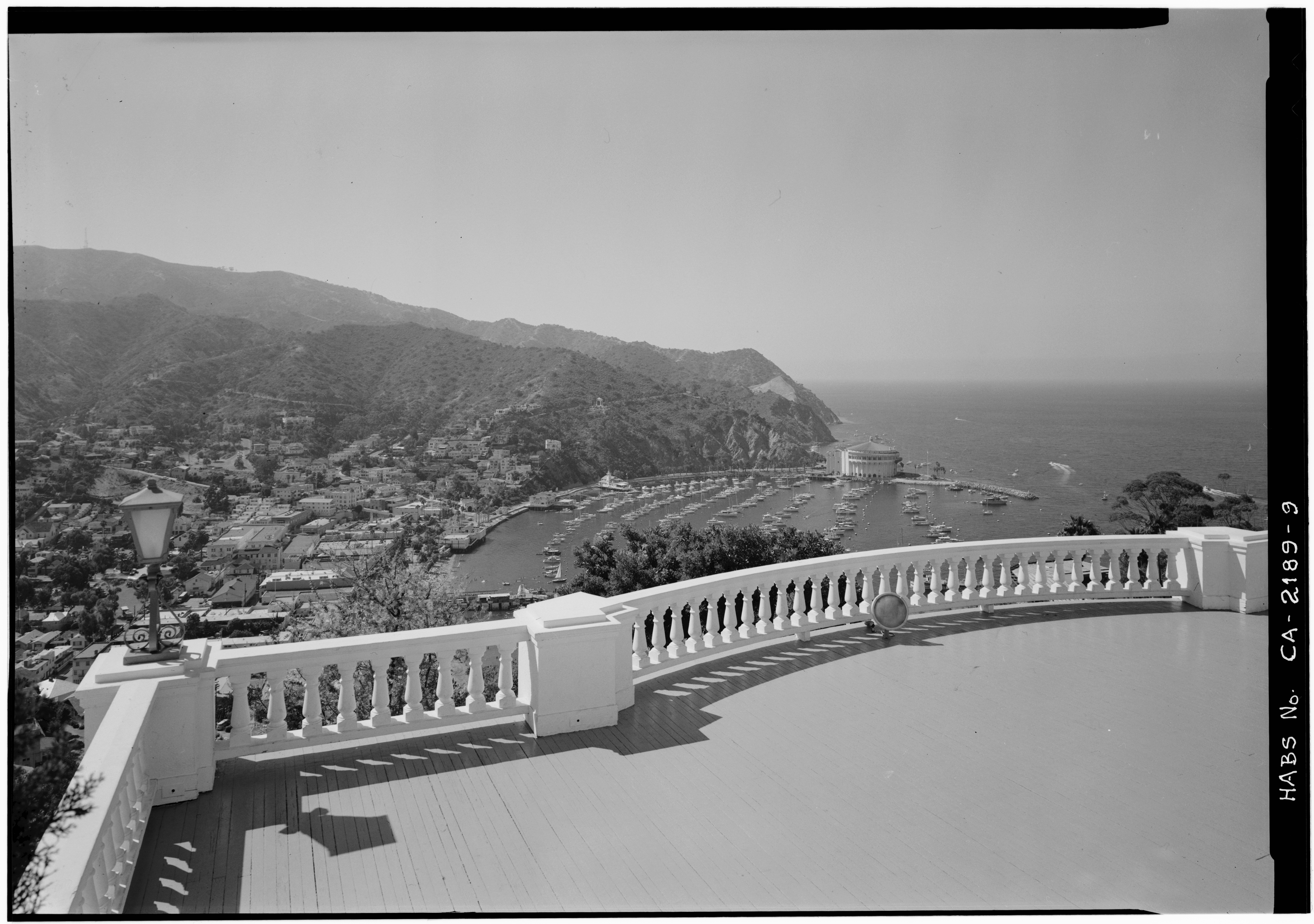
View of Avalon Bay, date unknown

Since 1985, it has been leased, and was turned into a luxury hotel. It is now known as The Inn on Mt Ada.
