= Wrigley (surname) =

- Pronunciation: /ˈrɪɡli/

Origin
- Origin: Old English
- Meaning: From woodland clearing
- Region of origin: from Wrigley Head near Salford, Lancashire, England

Other names
- Variant forms: Wrygley, Wrigley, Wrigly, Wriggley, Wriggeley, Riggeley, Rigley, Rigly and Riggle
- Derived: wrigian

Wrigley is an English surname originating in the county of Lancashire.

- Alan Wrigley (born 1931), Australian writer on topics related to intelligence, defence and security
- Ammon Wrigley (1861–1946), English poet and local historian from Saddleworth
- Arthur Wrigley (1912–1965), English cricket scorer and statistician
- Arthur Joseph Wrigley (1902–1983), obstetrician and gynaecologist
- Bernard Wrigley (born 1948), English singer, actor and comedian
- Cara Wrigley (born 1985), Australian industrial designer, design researcher and author
- David Wrigley, English general practitioner
- Derek Fuller Wrigley (born 1924), British-born Australian architect
- Drew Wrigley (born 1965), American politician
- E.A. Wrigley (1931–2022), British historical demographer
- Edgar Wrigley (1886−1958), New Zealand rugby union and rugby league player
- George Weston Wrigley (1847–1907), Canadian journalist and social reformer
- Henry Wrigley (1892–1987), Royal Australian Air Force (RAAF) officer
- Hugh Wrigley (1891–1980), Australian Army officer
- Kurt Wrigley (born 1969), Australian rugby league player
- Leslie James Wrigley (1875–1933), Australian academic and educationalist
- Martin Wrigley, British politician
- Nicholas Wrigley (born 1955), British merchant banker
- Robert Wrigley (born 1951), American poet and educator
- Stephen Wrigley (born 1987), Australian football player
- Sylvia Spruck Wrigley (born 1968), American/German writer of science fiction, fantasy and aviation non-fiction
- Tony Wrigley (born 1931), historical demographer
- Wilf Wrigley (born 1949), English football player
- Zeke Wrigley (1874–1952), baseball player

== In the Wm. Wrigley Jr. Company ==
- William Wrigley Jr. (1861–1932), founder of the Wm. Wrigley Jr. Company
- Philip K. Wrigley (1894–1977), son of William Wrigley Jr.
- William Wrigley III (1933–99), son of Philip K. Wrigley
- William Wrigley Jr. II (born 1963), son of William Wrigley III, and chairman

== In music ==
- The Wrigley Sisters (Jennifer and Hazel), folk music duo

== Fictional ==
- Simon 'Bigmac' Wrigley, character in the Johnny Maxwell trilogy by Terry Pratchett
