= Charles Rudolph =

American architect

- Born: March 22, 1854; St. Louis, Missouri
- Died: January 31, 1901 (aged 46); Wauwatosa, Wisconsin
- Occupation: Architect
- Buildings: Braun & Fitts Butterine Factory

Charles Rudolph (March 22, 1854 – January 31, 1901) was an architect primarily known for his designs in Chicago.

Born in St. Louis, Missouri, Rudolph attended Chicago's Dyrenfurth Academy and studied architecture under Bauer & Loebnitz and later with Augustus Bauer alone. He attended the Vienna Polytechnicum from 1877 to 1881, and graduated with honors.

Rudolph partnered with C.J. Furst, and designed such buildings as the William P. Henneberry House in 1883, the Braun & Fitts Butterine Factory in 1891, and the Crown Piano Company factory in 1895. Furst and Rudolph also designed the John York Store in 1888. After the store burned down, Furst and Rudolph designed its reconstruction in 1893.

Rudolph served as architect for the Chicago Board of Education from December 12, 1888, to December 10, 1890, designing Mulligan School, among others. Rudolph also designed Chicago's first natatorium.

Rudolph's partnership with Furst was dissolved on January 1, 1896, and he subsequently returned to St. Louis. Rudolph died January 31, 1901, in Wauwatosa, Wisconsin.
