= Wrigley Lodge =

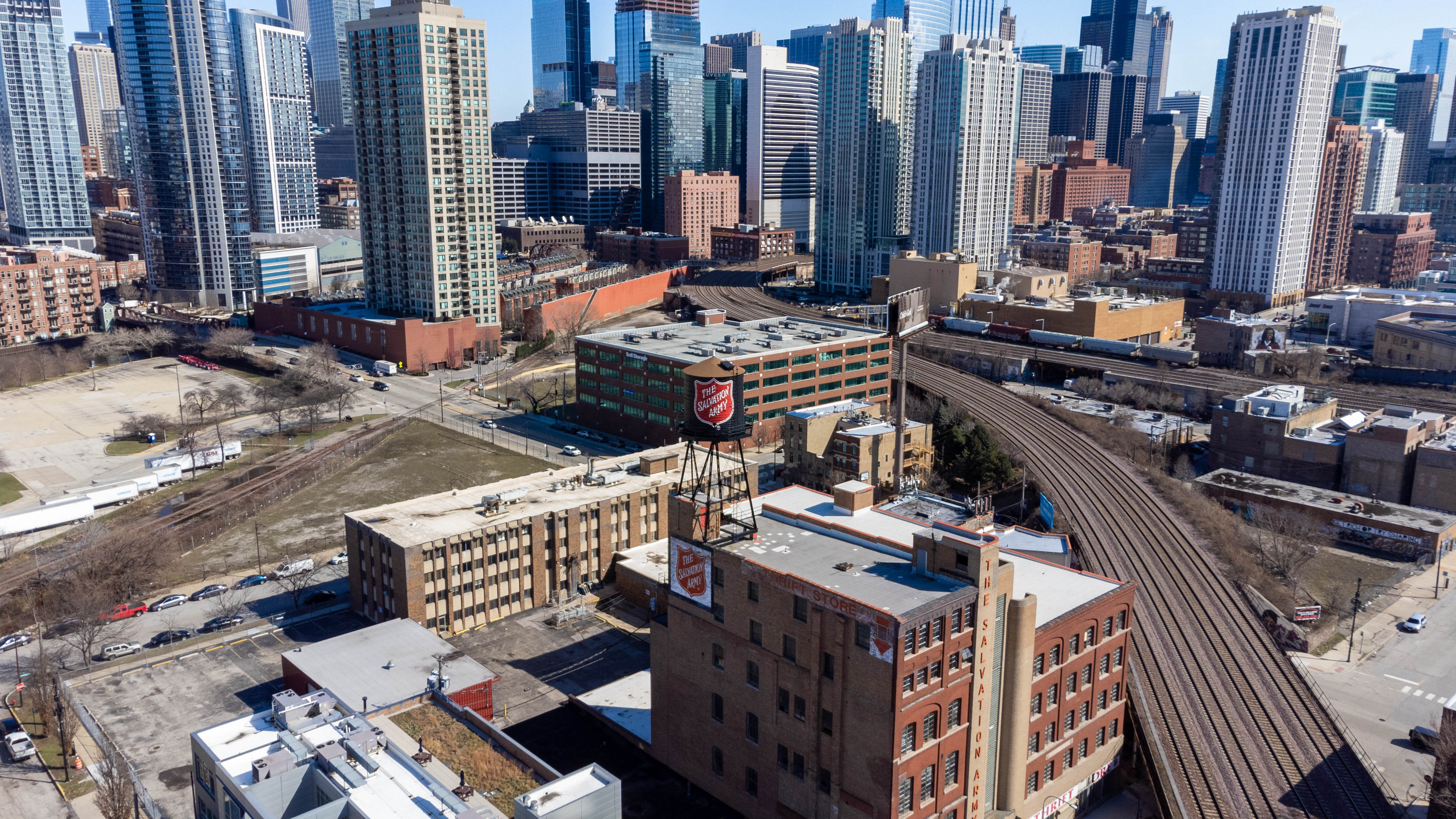
- Interactive map of the Wrigley Lodge area

General information
- Location: 509 N. Union, Chicago, Illinois
- Coordinates: 41°53′30.3″N 87°38′43.9″W
- Completed: 1891
- Owner: The Salvation Army

Technical details
- Floor count: 6

Design and construction
- Architects: C.J. Furst; Charles Rudolph

Wrigley Lodge is a building at 509 N. Union, Chicago, Illinois. Owned by the Salvation Army since 1931, it most recently housed a Salvation Army Thrift Store and adult rehabilitation center.

== History ==
=== Early uses ===
The building was designed by the architectural firm of Furst & Rudolph and was built in 1891 by Biemolt & Carter at a cost of between $40,000 and $50,000. The building was originally the Braun & Fitts Butterine Factory. In 1897, a law was enacted in Illinois prohibiting the coloring of butterine. In response, Braun & Fitts and Chicago's other butterine manufacturers threatened move their operations out of the state. However, Chicago's butterine producers decided to continue manufacturing and coloring butterine until arrests would be made, so the constitutionality of the law could be tested. The company's name was changed to John F. Jelke Company in 1906.

In 1912, the Dairy Farm Products Company purchased the building from the John F. Jelke Company. The Dairy Farm Products Company opened its plant in the building on October 17, 1912, manufacturing butter. In 1916, the building was sold to William Wrigley Jr. for approximately $125,000. The building would house the factory and offices of the Downey-Farrell Company, a margarine manufacturer that Wrigley was affiliated with. An addition was built in 1917, designed by Postle & Fischer, at a cost of $40,000. In 1923, the building was purchased by the Duz Company, a manufacturer of soap powder, for $384,000. Wrigley re-purchased the building in 1929.

=== Salvation Army ownership ===
William Wrigley Jr. gave the Salvation Army use of the building on October 11, 1930, to use as a lodging house for the unemployed. It was named the New Start Lodge and was formally opened at 3:30 pm on October 23, 1930. It contained 2,020 beds, and facilities to feed a similar number. Wrigley donated the property to them outright the following year, and it was renamed Wrigley Lodge. Following World War II, it served as a rehabilitation center for veterans.

In 1946, the Salvation Army began raising funds for the remodeling of Wrigley Lodge and the construction of new buildings. It was remodeled in the Streamline Moderne style, designed by Albert C. Fehlow, at a cost of $400,000, and was re-dedicated at 2 pm on January 18, 1951. A new one-story warehouse was also built behind the north half of the building. The building replaced the Central Social Service center, which was demolished to make way for the construction of the Congress Expressway, and served as a rehabilitation center for homeless and disabled men, with housing accommodations for 150 men. The thrift store, located in the building, funded the center's operations and employed some of the men residing in the building.

In the following years, the building has served the Salvation Army in similar roles, and continues to house a thrift store as part of a multi-building complex owned by the Salvation Army. The building's rooftop water tower was restored in 2017. The Salvation Army announced their intention to sell the complex in August 2019. In February 2021, Preservation Chicago listed Wrigley Lodge as one of Chicago's most endangered buildings. The Salvation Army closed the adult rehabilitation center and thrift store in March 2022.
