= Wrigley Botanical Gardens =

Memorial and garden on Santa Catalina Island

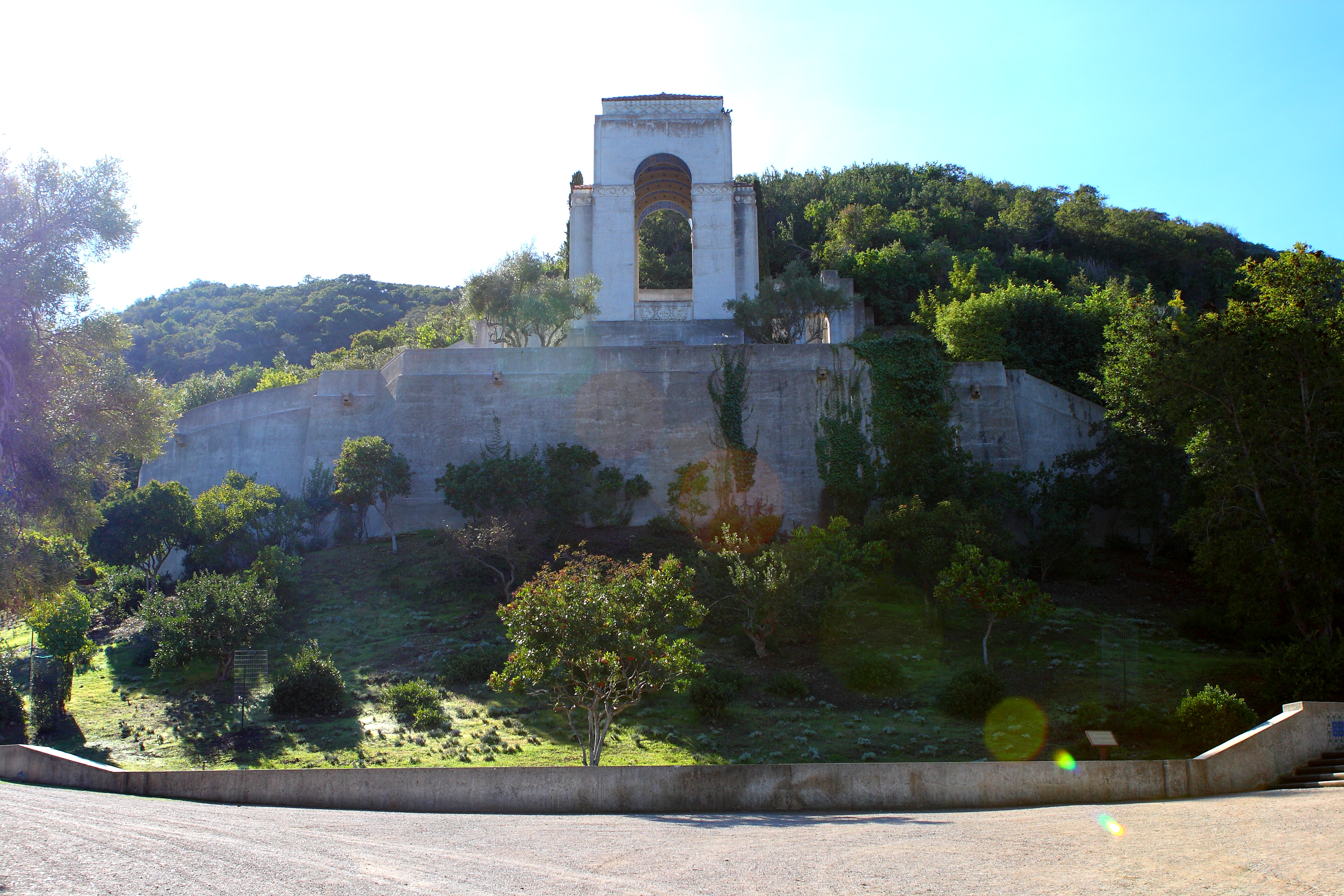
- Wrigley Memorial from the front

- Location within California Location within the United States
- Type: Botanical garden
- Location: Santa Catalina Island, California
- Coordinates: 33°19′44″N 118°20′26″W
- Area: 38 acres (15 ha)
- Website: Official website

The Wrigley Memorial & Botanic Garden is a botanic garden on Santa Catalina Island, California, operated by the Catalina Island Conservancy. It also contains a memorial to William Wrigley Jr.

== Garden ==
The botanic garden covers 38 acres (154,000 m^{2}) near the town of Avalon on Catalina, off the shore from Los Angeles, California, US. The garden places a special emphasis on California island endemic plants, i.e., plants that grow naturally on one or more of the Channel Islands of California but nowhere else in the world.

== Wrigley memorial ==
William Wrigley Jr. (1861–1932) bought most of Catalina Island in 1919 with proceeds from his chewing gum empire. When he died on January 26, 1932, at age 70, he was interred near his Catalina home, in a tower in the botanical gardens. The tower stands 130 feet high and is primarily built with local materials. Wrigley's body has been moved to Forest Lawn in Glendale, but his original grave memorial marker still adorns the tower site.

== Appearances in popular culture ==
The botanic gardens were featured by Huell Howser in California's Golden Parks Episode 139.

== See also ==
- List of botanical gardens in the United States
