= William Perez =

American businessman (born 1947)

Bill Perez
- Born: September 10, 1947 (age 78); Akron, Ohio, U.S.
- Education: Cornell University (BA); Thunderbird School of Global Management (MBA)

William David "Bill" Perez (born September 10, 1947) is an American businessman who was the chief executive officer of Wm. Wrigley Jr. Company. He had earlier served in a similar capacity at Nike, Inc. Prior to that, Perez had risen to become the chief executive officer at S. C. Johnson & Son.

== Early life ==
William David Perez was born on September 10, 1947, in Akron, Ohio. He went to high school at Western Reserve Academy, a private coeducational boarding school in Hudson, Ohio, before attending Cornell University, where he was a member of Sigma Alpha Epsilon fraternity. In addition, Perez has a graduate degree from the Thunderbird School of Global Management.

== Business career ==
Perez worked at S. C. Johnson from 1970 to 2004. He spent eight years as president and CEO of S. C. Johnson & Son. On December 28, 2004, Perez succeeded Phil Knight as CEO of Nike, Inc and served from December 2004 until his announcement on January 23, 2006, that he was resigning from Nike due to disagreements with Knight over how to run the company. Perez received $8 million in severance pay.

On October 3, 2006, Perez succeeded William Wrigley Jr. II as CEO of Wm. Wrigley Jr. Company, the world's largest chewing-gum manufacturer. He was the first person outside the Wrigley family to head the century-old company. He also joined Wrigley's board of directors. On January 11, 2010, Perez joined Greenhill & Co. as a senior advisor.

=== Positions held on boards of directors ===
- Johnson Outdoors (2018 to present)
- Whirlpool Corporation (2009 to present)
- Johnson & Johnson (2007 to present)
- Campbell Soup Company (2009 to 2012)
- Kellogg Company (2000 to 2006)
- Nike, Inc. (2004 to 2006)
- The May Department Stores Company (1998-2004)
- Hallmark Cards
