= William Wrigley Jr. =

American businessman (1861–1932)

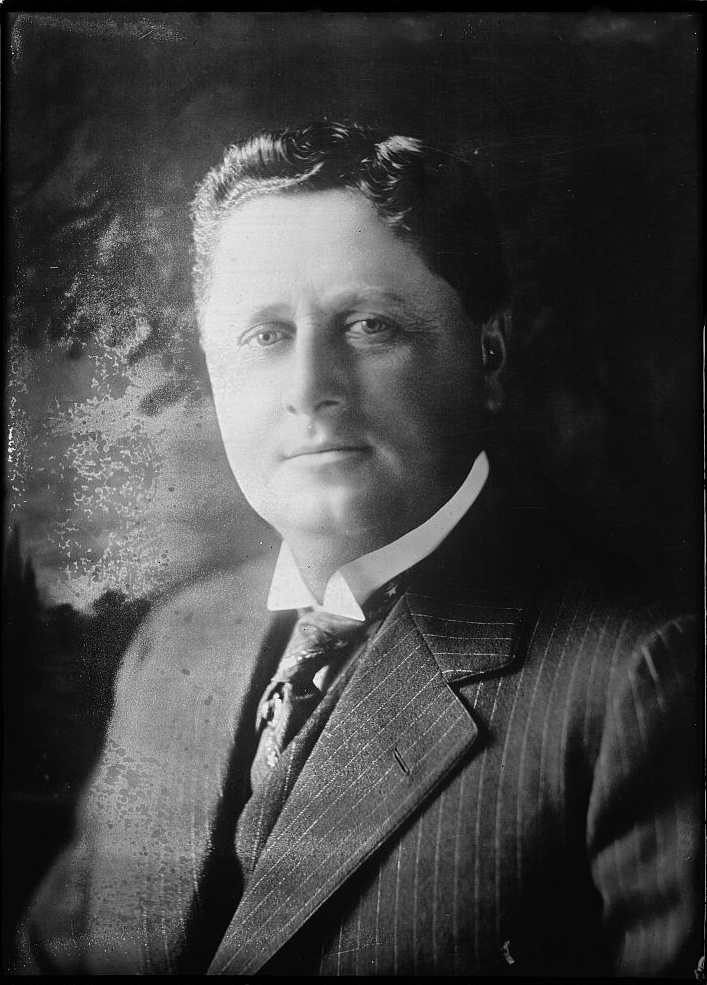
- Wrigley in 1915
- Born: September 30, 1861; Philadelphia, Pennsylvania, U.S.
- Died: January 26, 1932 (aged 70); Phoenix, Arizona, U.S.
- Resting place: Forest Lawn Memorial Park, Glendale, California
- Occupation: Entrepreneur
- Known for: Founder of Wm. Wrigley Jr. Company
- Spouse: Ada Elizabeth Foote
- Children: Dorothy, Philip Knight Wrigley
- Parent(s): William and Mary A. Ladley

William Mills Wrigley Jr. (September 30, 1861 – January 26, 1932) was an American chewing gum industrialist. He founded the Wm. Wrigley Jr. Company in 1891.

== Biography ==
William Mills Wrigley Jr. was born in Philadelphia, Pennsylvania, on September 30, 1861, the son of Mary Ann (née Ladley) and William Mills Wrigley Sr. His family members were Quakers of English descent.

In 1891, Wrigley moved from Philadelphia to Chicago to go into business for himself. He had $32 to his name (equivalent to ~$1,149.23 in 2026) and with it, he formed a business to sell Wrigley's Scouring Soap. He offered customers small premiums, particularly baking powder, as an incentive to buy his soap. Finding the baking powder was more popular than his soap, Wrigley switched to selling baking powder, and giving his customers two packages of chewing gum for each can of baking powder they purchased. Again, Wrigley found that the premium he offered was more popular than his base product, and his company began to concentrate on the manufacture and sale of chewing gum. In this business, Wrigley made his name and fortune.

Wrigley played an instrumental role in the development of Santa Catalina Island, California, off the shore of Long Beach, California. He bought a controlling interest in the Santa Catalina Island Company in 1919 and with the company received the island. Wrigley improved the island with public utilities, new steamships, a hotel, the Casino building, and extensive plantings of trees, shrubs, and flowers. He also sought to create an enterprise that would help employ local residents. By making use of clay and minerals found on the island at a beach near Avalon, in 1927 William Wrigley Jr. created the Pebbly Beach quarry and tile plant. Along with creating jobs for Avalon residents, the plant also supplied material for Wrigley's numerous building projects on the island. After building the Avalon Casino in 1929, the Catalina Clay Products Tile and Pottery Plant began producing glazed tiles, dinnerware and other household items such as bookends.

Another of Wrigley's legacies was his plan for the future of Catalina Island—that it be protected for future generations to enjoy. In 1972, his son, Philip K. Wrigley, established the Catalina Island Conservancy for this purpose and transferred all family ownership to it. Wrigley is honored by the Wrigley Memorial in the Wrigley Botanical Gardens on the island.

The Wrigley district of Long Beach, California bears his name.

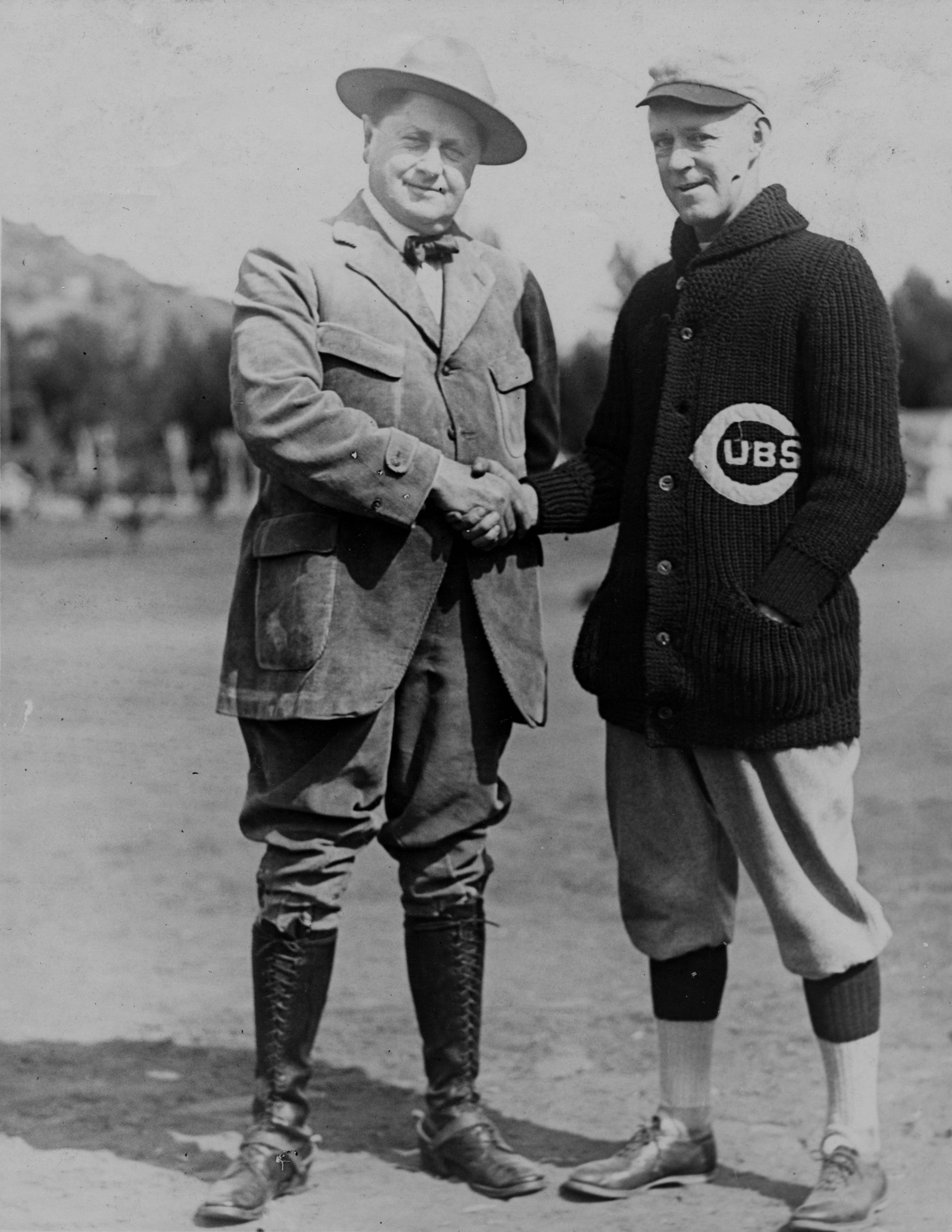
Wrigley (left) with Chicago Cubs player Johnny Evers in 1921

In 1916, Wrigley bought a minority stake in the Chicago Cubs baseball team as part of a group headed by Charles Weeghman, former owner of the Federal League's Chicago Whales. Over the next four years, as Weeghman's lunch-counter business declined, he was forced to sell much of his stock in the ball club to Wrigley. By 1918, Weeghman had sold all of his stock to Wrigley, making Wrigley the largest shareholder and principal owner, and by 1921, Wrigley was majority owner. Wrigley Field, the Cubs' ballpark in Chicago, was renamed for him in 1926, and has continued to bear the name to this day. The now-demolished former home of the Los Angeles Angels of the Pacific Coast League, at that time the Cubs' top farm team, was also called Wrigley Field. Wrigley purchased full control of the Cubs from Albert Lasker in 1925.

In 1930, Wrigley gave the Salvation Army use of a six-story factory building he owned in Chicago to use as a lodging house for the unemployed. He donated the building, then called New Start Lodge, to the Salvation Army outright the following year. It was renamed Wrigley Lodge later that year.

The Arizona Biltmore Hotel in Phoenix, Arizona was partially financed and wholly owned by Wrigley, who finished the nearby Wrigley Mansion as a winter cottage in 1931. At 16,000 square feet (1,500 m^{2}), it was the smallest of his five residences.

== Death ==
William Wrigley Jr. died on January 26, 1932, at his Phoenix mansion, at age 70. He was stricken by acute indigestion, complicated by a heart attack and apoplexy. He was interred in his custom-designed sarcophagus located in the tower of the Wrigley Memorial & Botanical Gardens near his beloved home on California's Catalina Island. In 1947, Wrigley's remains were moved to allow the gardens to be made public. There is a rumor that the remains were moved during World War II due to "wartime security concerns". His original grave memorial marker still adorns the tower site. Wrigley was reinterred in the corridor alcove end of the Sanctuary of Gratitude, at Forest Lawn Memorial Park Cemetery in Glendale, California.

His estate, estimated to be worth US$20,215,000 (equivalent to about $477,024,700 in 2025), went to daughter Dorothy Wrigley Offield and son Philip K. Wrigley. The son continued to run the company until his death in 1977. His ashes were interred near his father, in the same Sanctuary of Gratitude alcove.

Wrigley Jr. was inducted into the Junior Achievement U.S. Business Hall of Fame in 2000.

His great-grandson, William Wrigley Jr. II, was the executive chairman and CEO of the Wrigley Company from 1999 until 2006, when he turned it over to William Perez, the first non-Wrigley head of the company.

== Gallery ==
William Wrigley Jr.
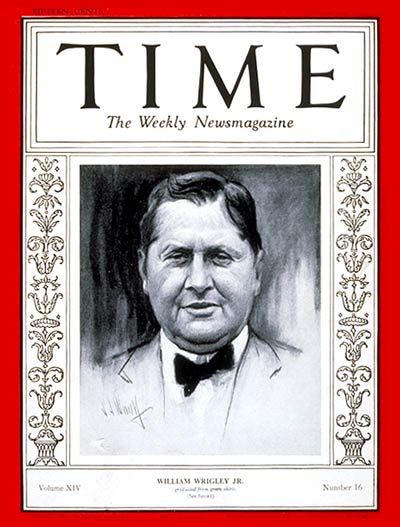
William Wrigley Jr. on the cover of Time in 1929

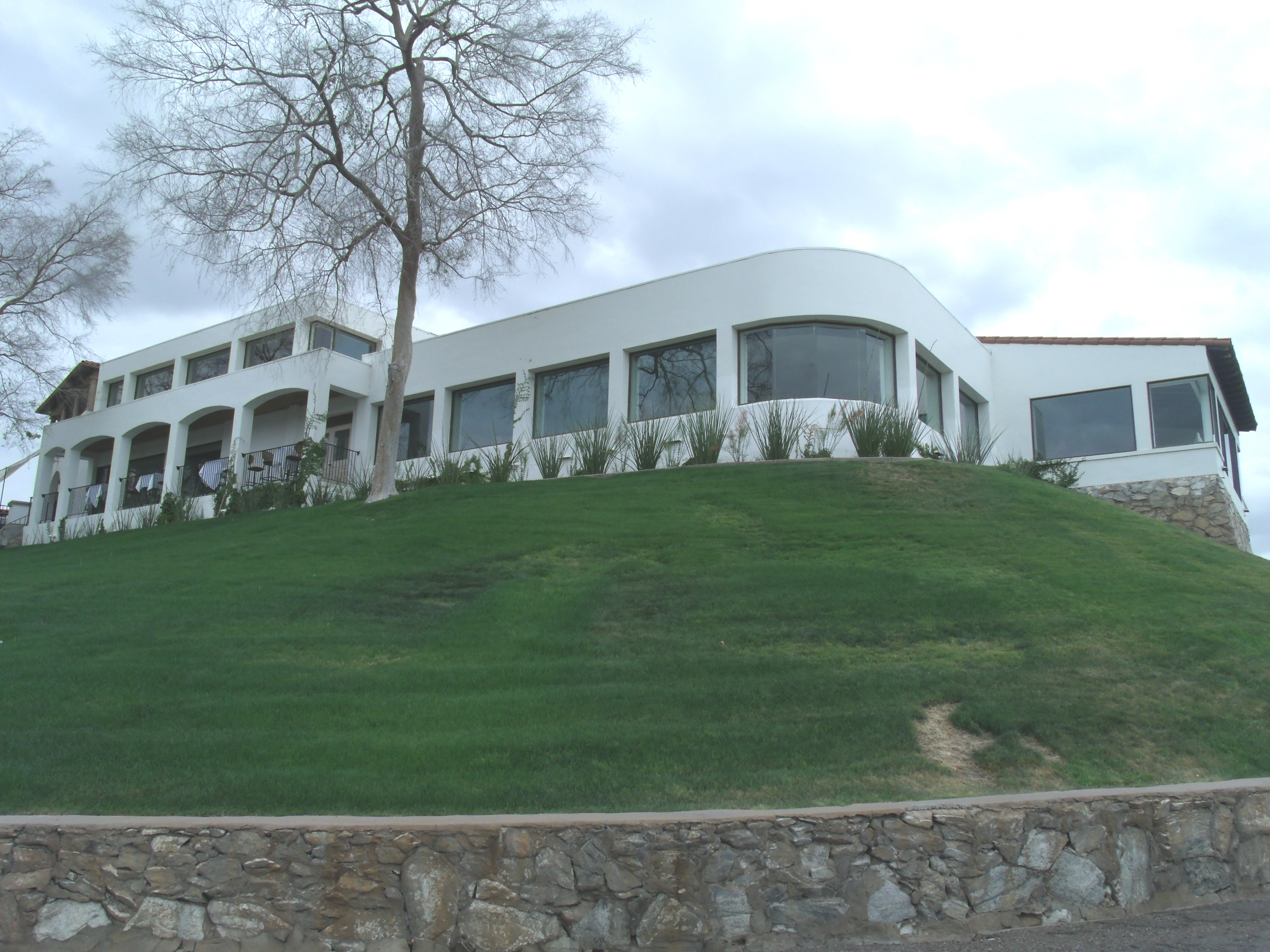
The Wrigley Mansion in Phoenix, Arizona (Note: The mansion was built between 1929 and 1931. It is located at 2501 East Telewa Trail. The historic mansion is also known as “La Colina Solana”. The mansion has been designated as a Phoenix Point of Pride. The mansion was listed as the “William Wrigley Jr., Winter Cottage” on the National Register of Historic Places on August 16, 1989, ref.: #89001045.)

The former Wrigley Mansion in Pasadena, California, now the headquarters of the Tournament of Roses Parade

Wrigley's steamship the Catalina leaving the Los Angeles docks, 1924

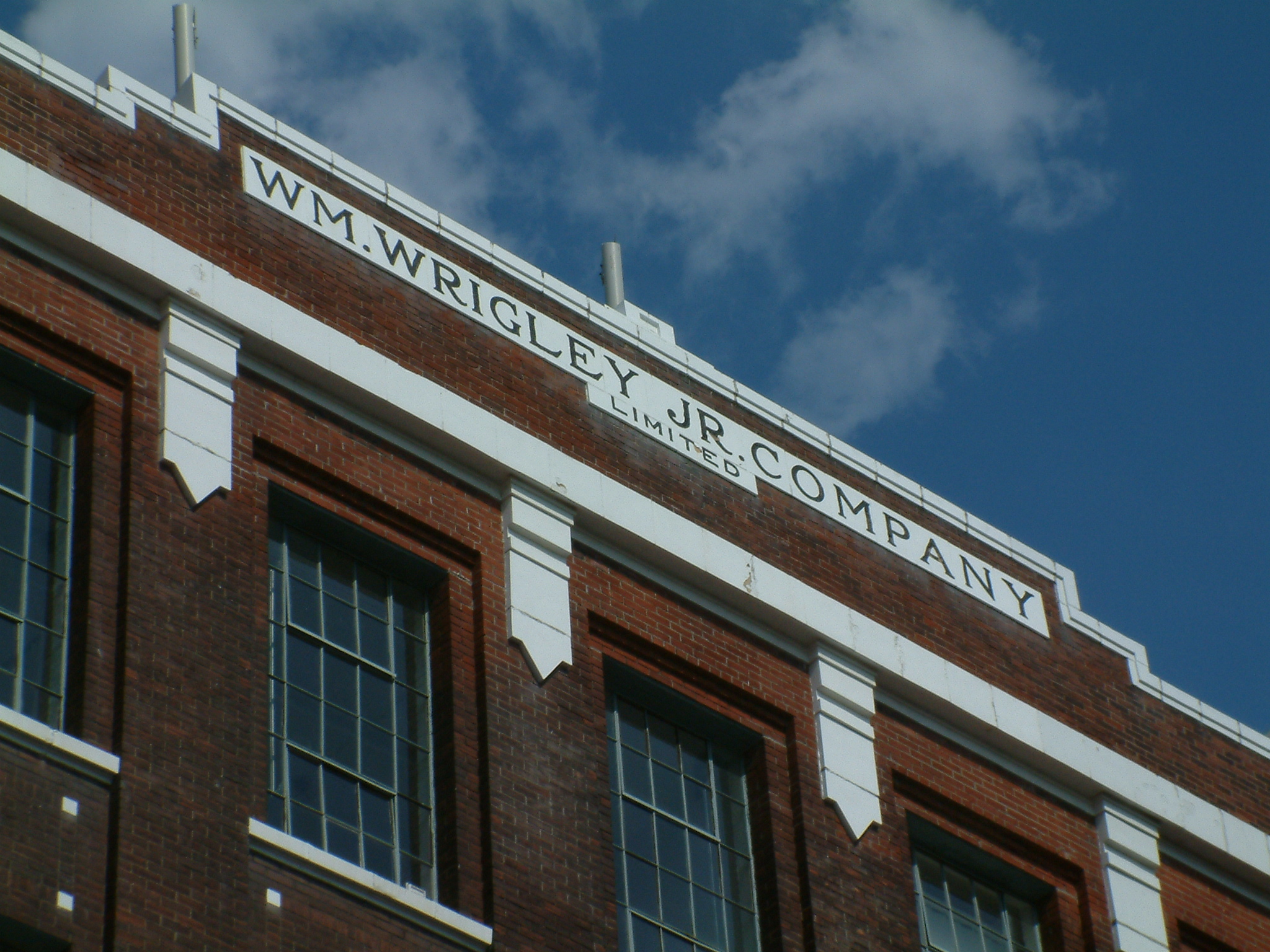
The Wrigley Lofts, formerly Wm. Wrigley Jr. Co. Ltd., located in Toronto, Canada

== See also ==
- Wrigley Company
- Wrigley Mansion
- William Wrigley Jr. Summer Cottage
- Tournament House, formerly the Wrigley Mansion, in Pasadena, California
