= Wrigley Mansion =

Historic house in Phoenix, Arizona

- William Wrigley Jr. Winter Cottage
- U.S. National Register of Historic Places
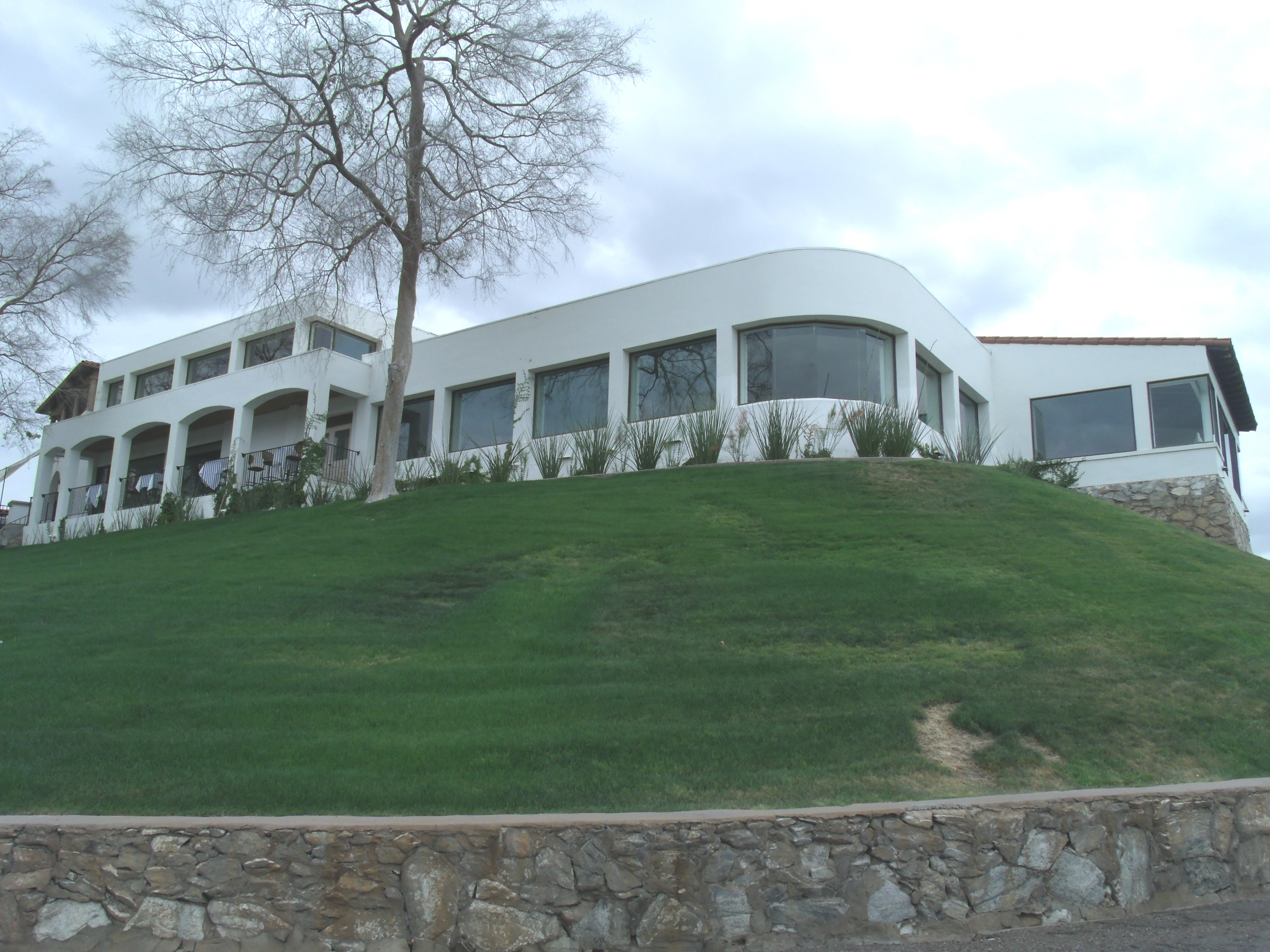
- Wrigley Mansion

- Location within Arizona Location within the United States
- Location: 2501 E. Telawa Trail, Phoenix, Arizona
- Coordinates: 33°31′21.74″N 112°1′33.61″W
- Built: 1932
- Architect: Heitschmidt, Earl T.
- Architectural style: Mission/Spanish Revival
- NRHP reference No.: 89001045
- Added to NRHP: August 16, 1989

The Wrigley Mansion in Phoenix, Arizona, is a landmark building constructed between 1929 and 1931 by chewing-gum magnate William Wrigley Jr. It is also known as William Wrigley Jr. Winter Cottage and as La Colina Solana.

Located at 2501 East Telewa Trail, it sits atop a 100-foot (30 m) knoll with views of greater Phoenix to the south, close to the Arizona Biltmore Hotel, which Wrigley owned.

== History ==
Architect Earl Heitschmidt of Los Angeles designed the home at a cost of $1.2 million, in a combination of styles, including Spanish Colonial. The William Simpson Construction Company also of Los Angeles built the home. It has 24 rooms, 12 bathrooms, and over 16,000 square feet (1,500 m^{2}). Much of the extensive tilework was shipped to Phoenix from Wrigley's own factory in Catalina, hauled by mule to the site.

The Wrigleys maintained other residences in Chicago; Philadelphia; Lake Geneva, Wisconsin; Catalina Island; and Pasadena, and used this, the smallest of their houses, for only a few weeks a year. William Wrigley died in 1932, shortly after its completion.

The Wrigley Mansion in Pasadena was donated to the City of Pasadena by Mrs. Wrigley for the use of the Pasadena Tournament of Roses Association as its offices. The association is the producer of the annual Rose Parade and Rose Bowl games.

Wrigley Mansion Club

In July 1992, Geordie Hormel bought the mansion and made it available for meetings, conventions and similar functions. Due to zoning regulation, The Wrigley Mansion must operate as a private club.

== Landmark designations ==
The Wrigley Mansion was listed on the National Register of Historic Places in 1989.

The mansion has been designated as a Phoenix Point of Pride.

The mansion has been Winner of The Knot Weddings for 2011, 2009, and 2008.

== Gallery ==
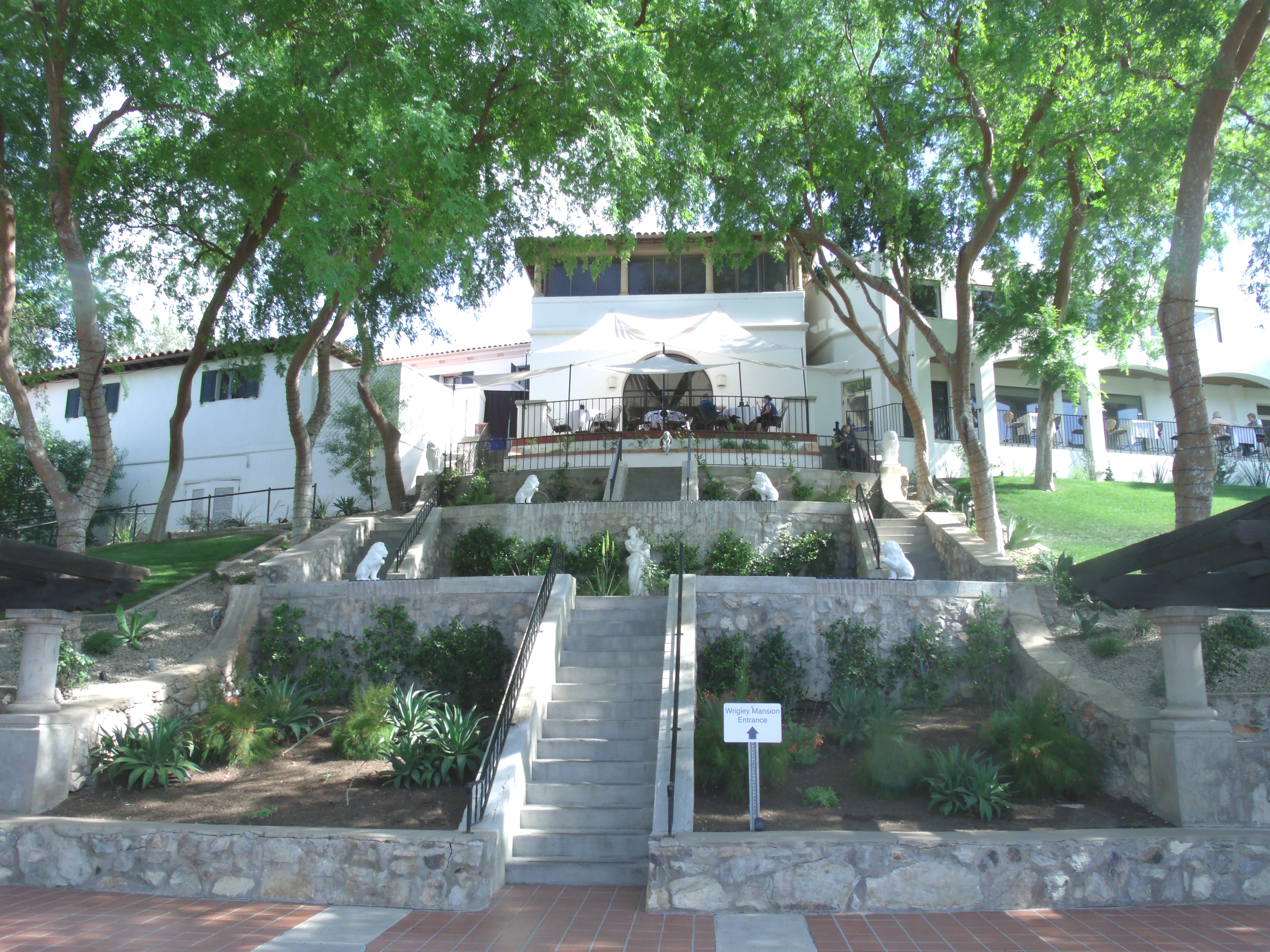
Pedestrian garden entrance sequence to the Wrigley Mansion

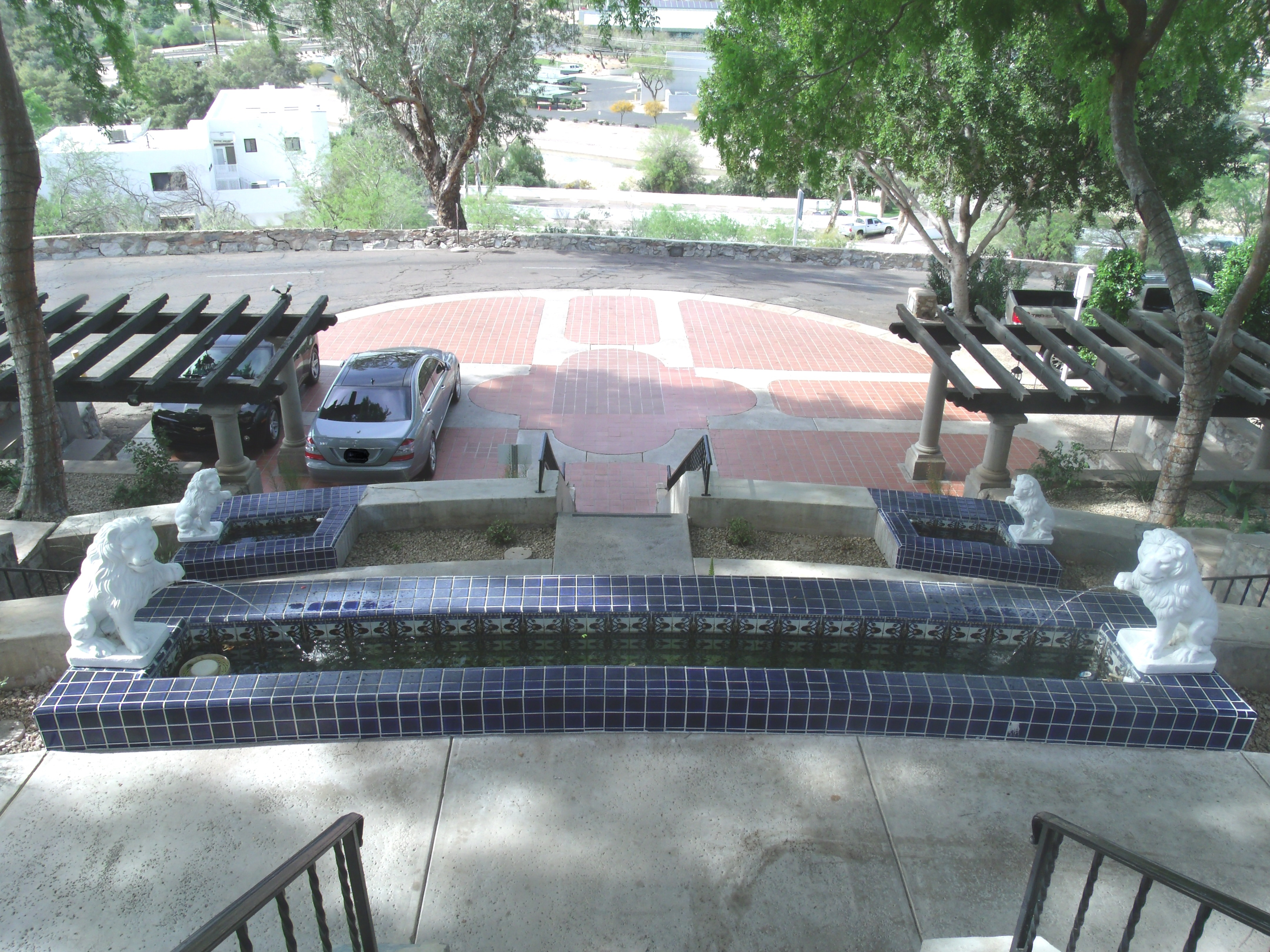
View of garden, from the upper entrance terrace

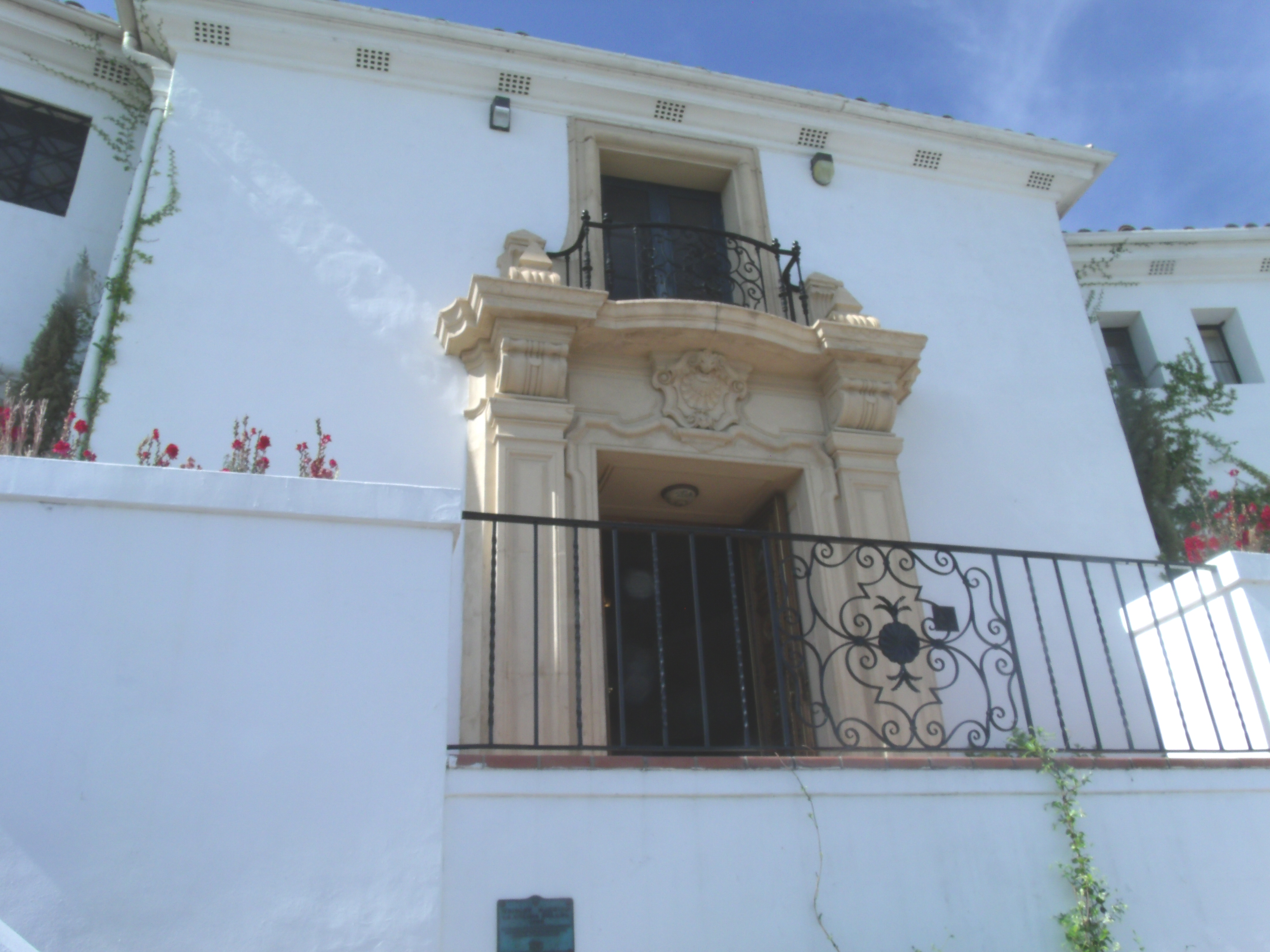
Main portal of the Wrigley Mansion

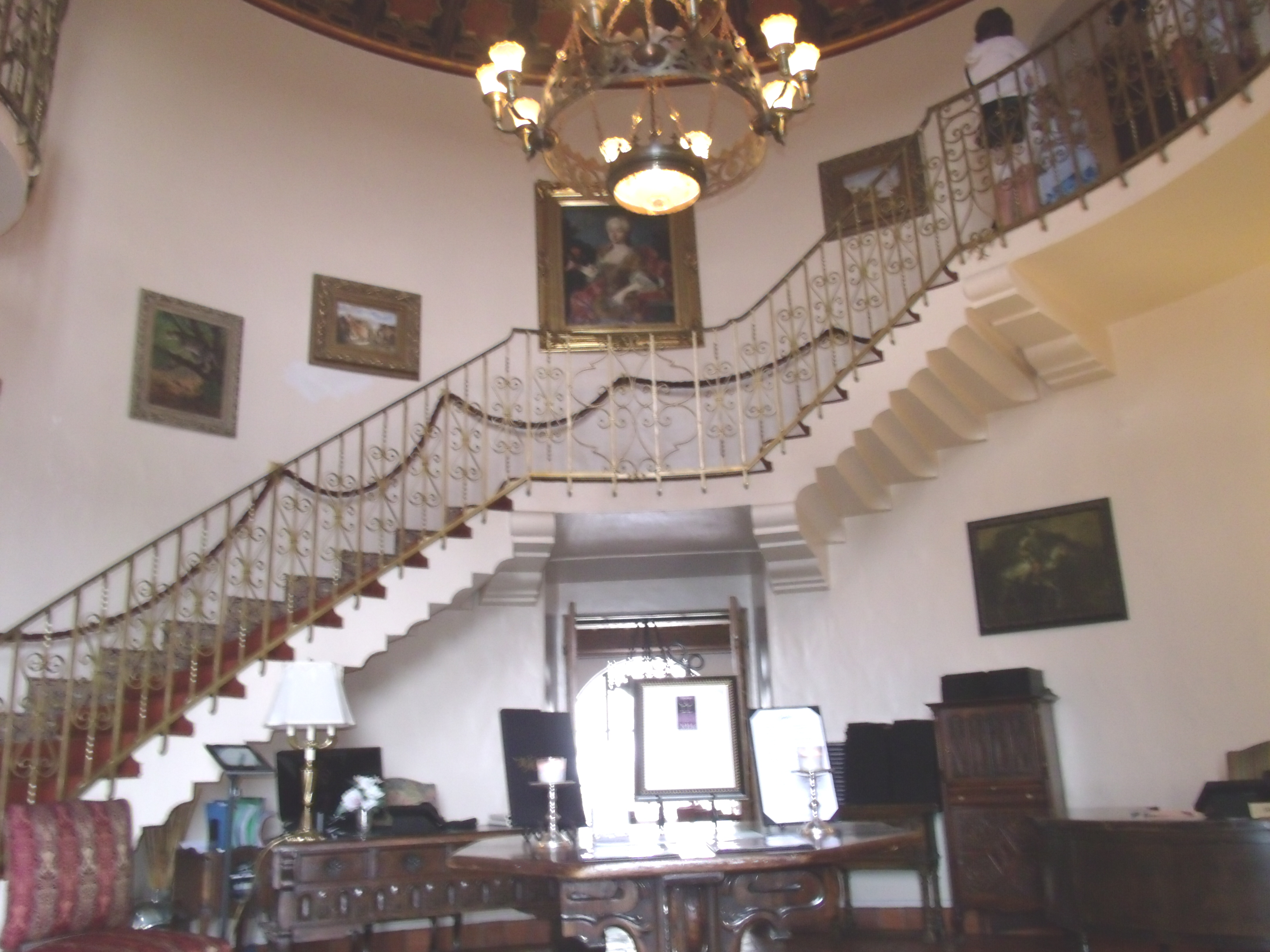
Entrance foyer and main staircase

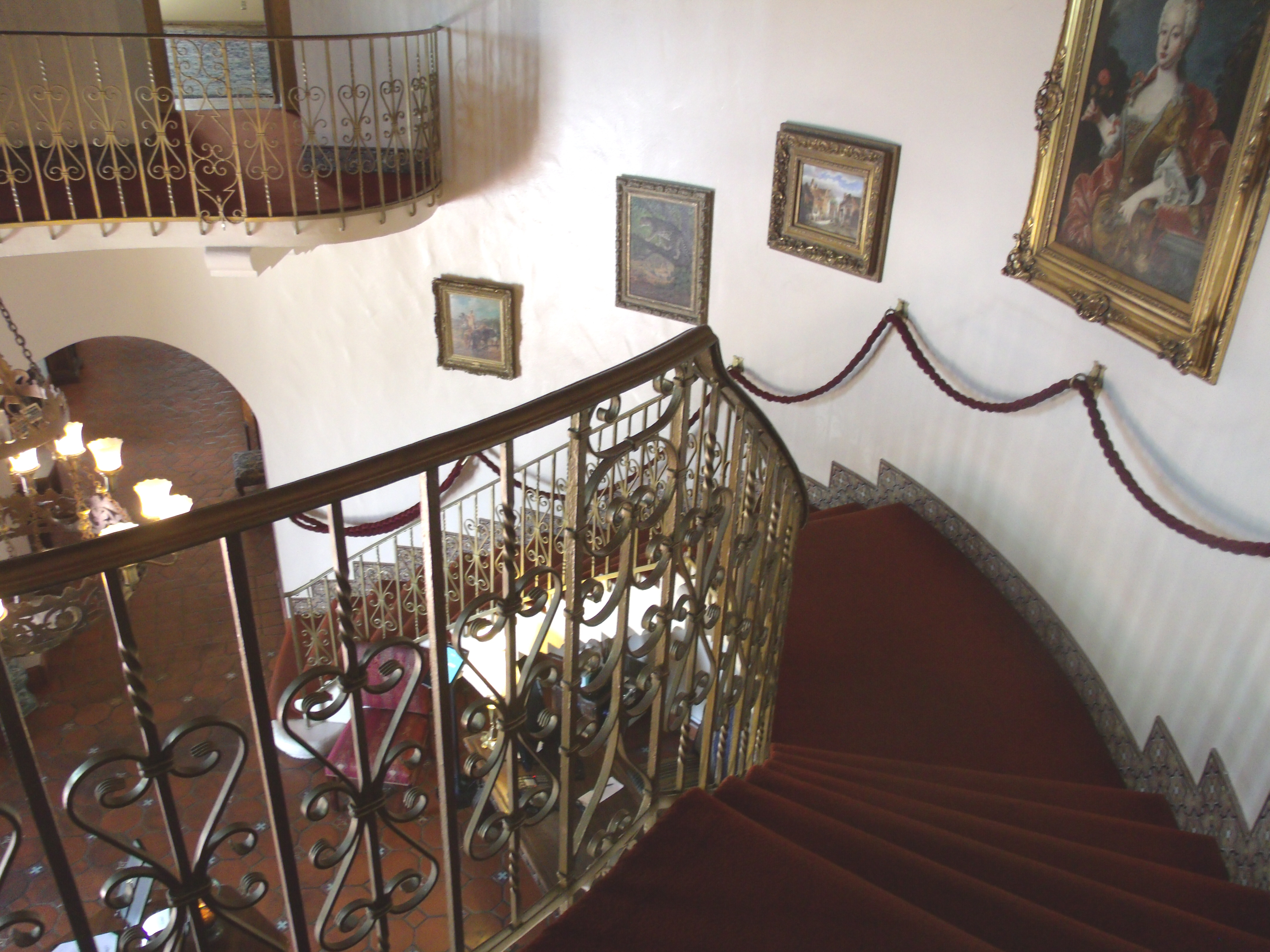
View of foyer from the top of the main staircase

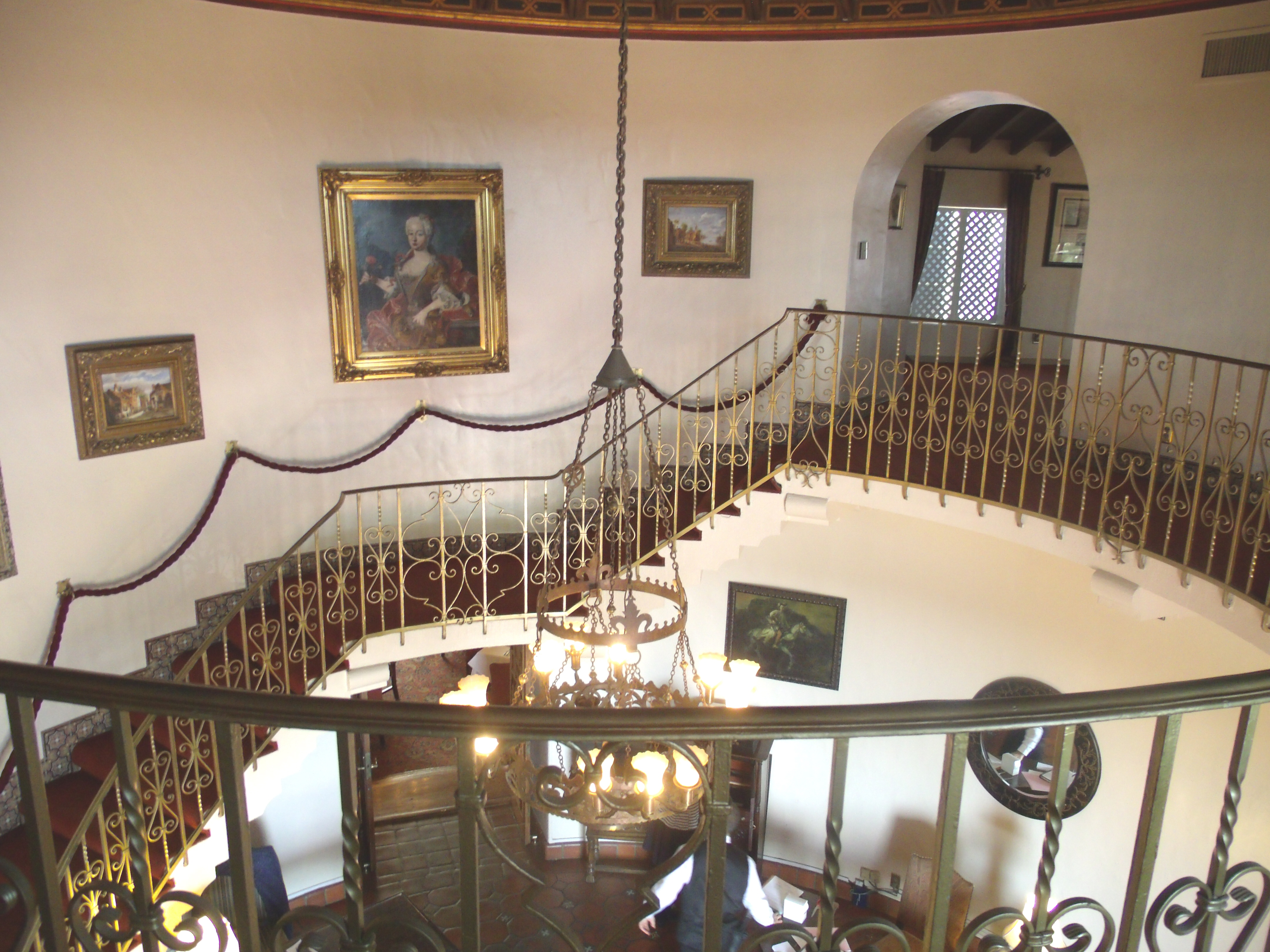
View of foyer from balcony

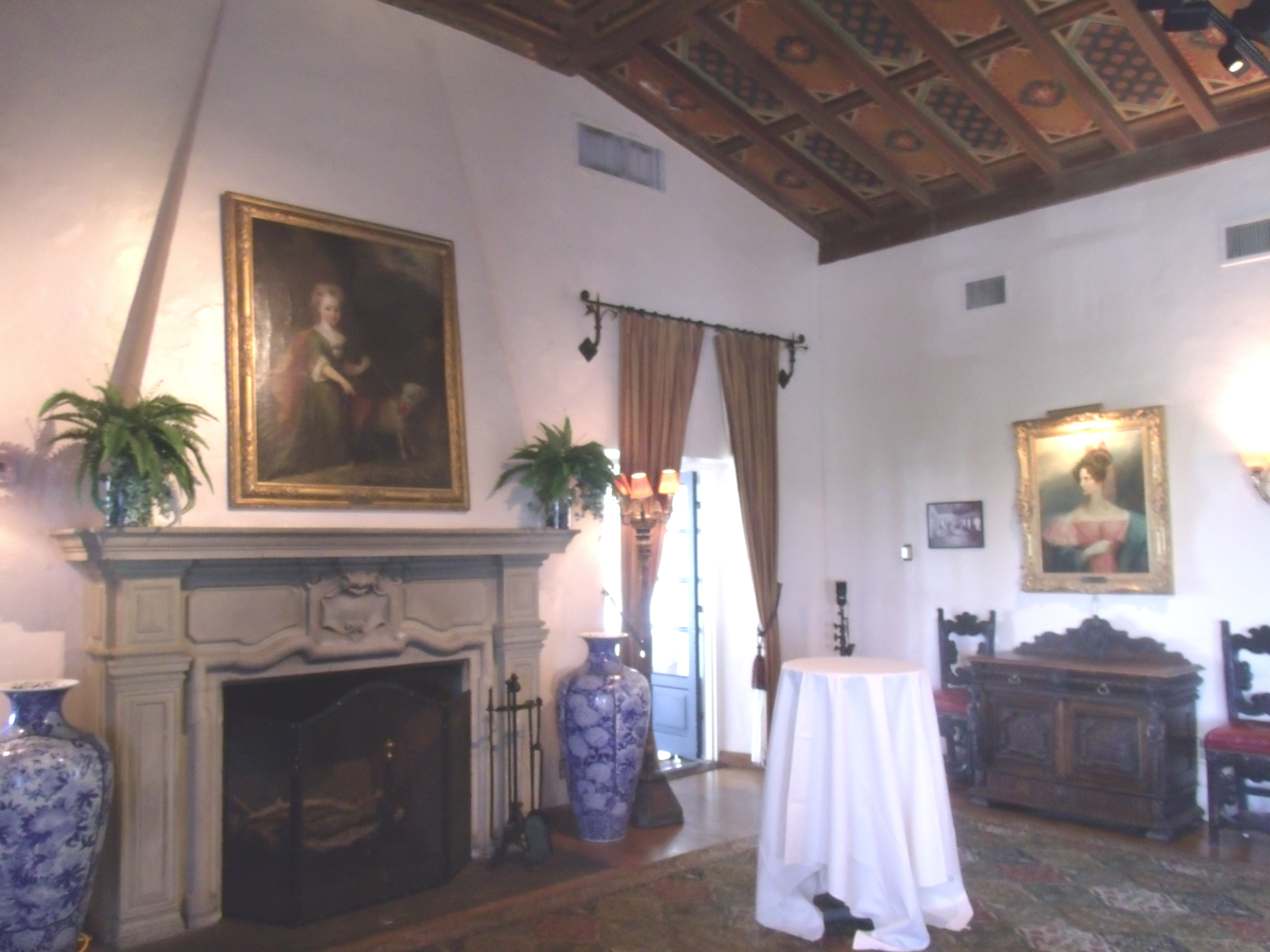
Living room

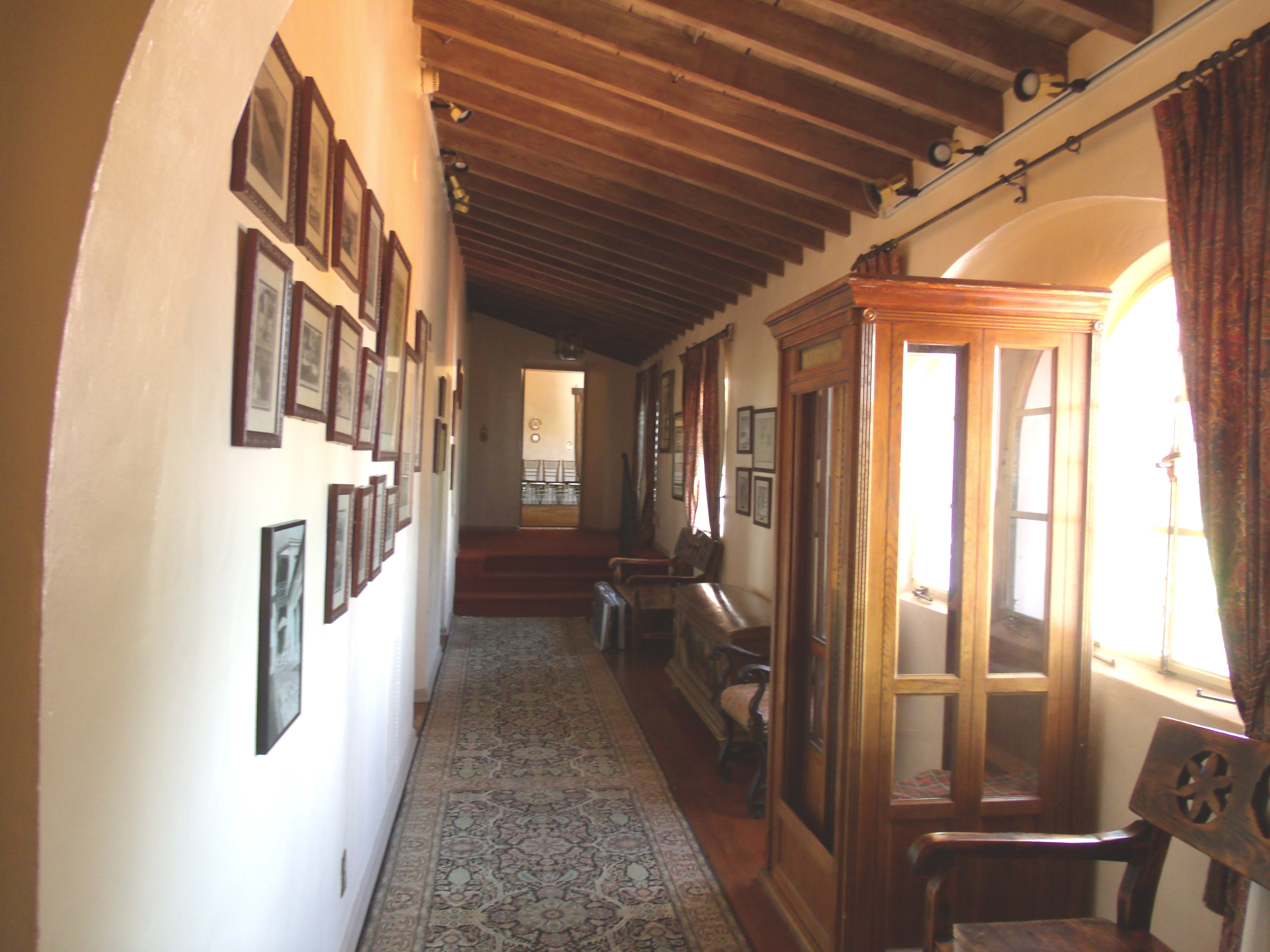
Hallway

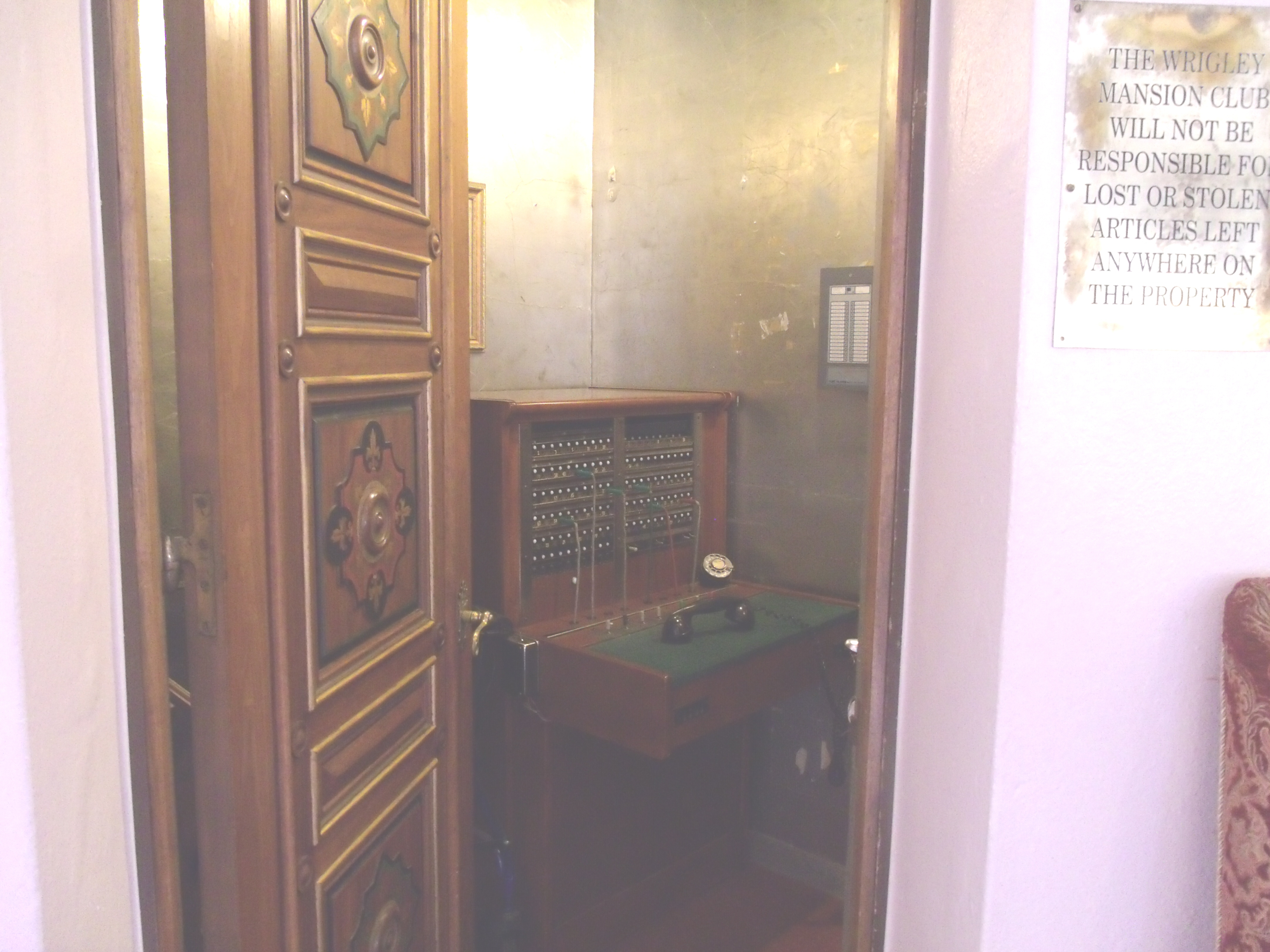
Telephone operator's booth

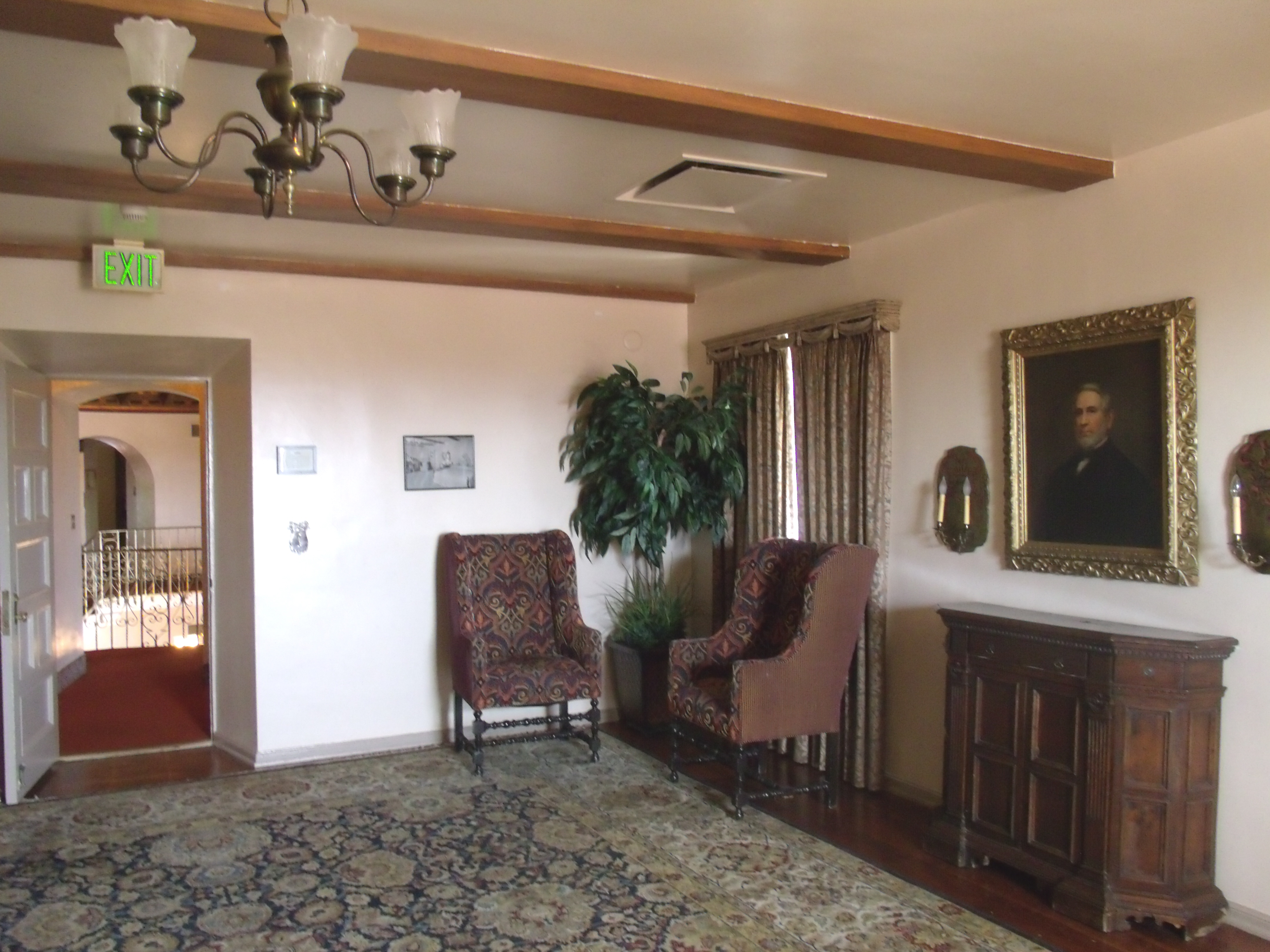
Second floor room

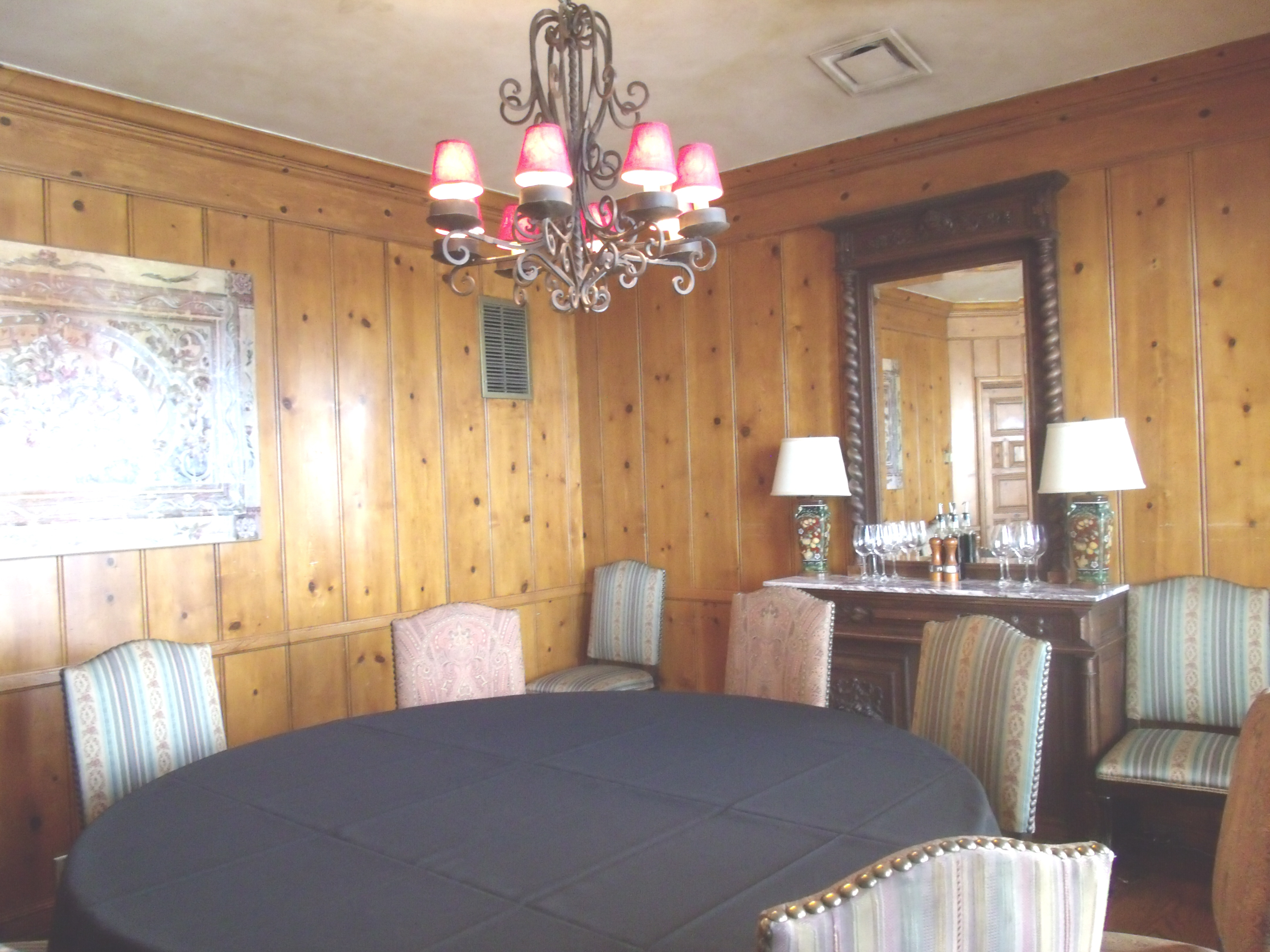
Second floor room

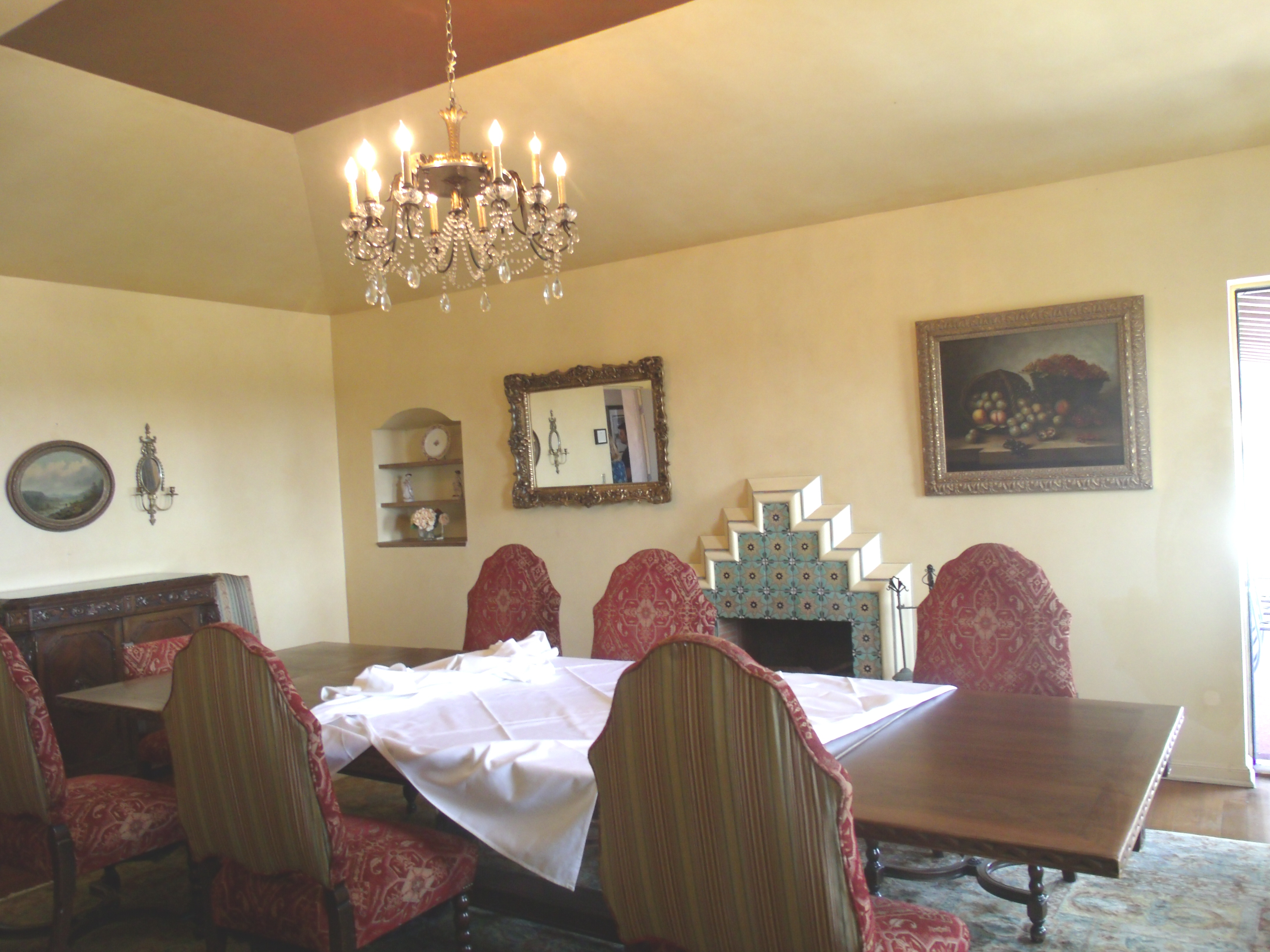
A bedroom where Elvis Presley reportedly stayed

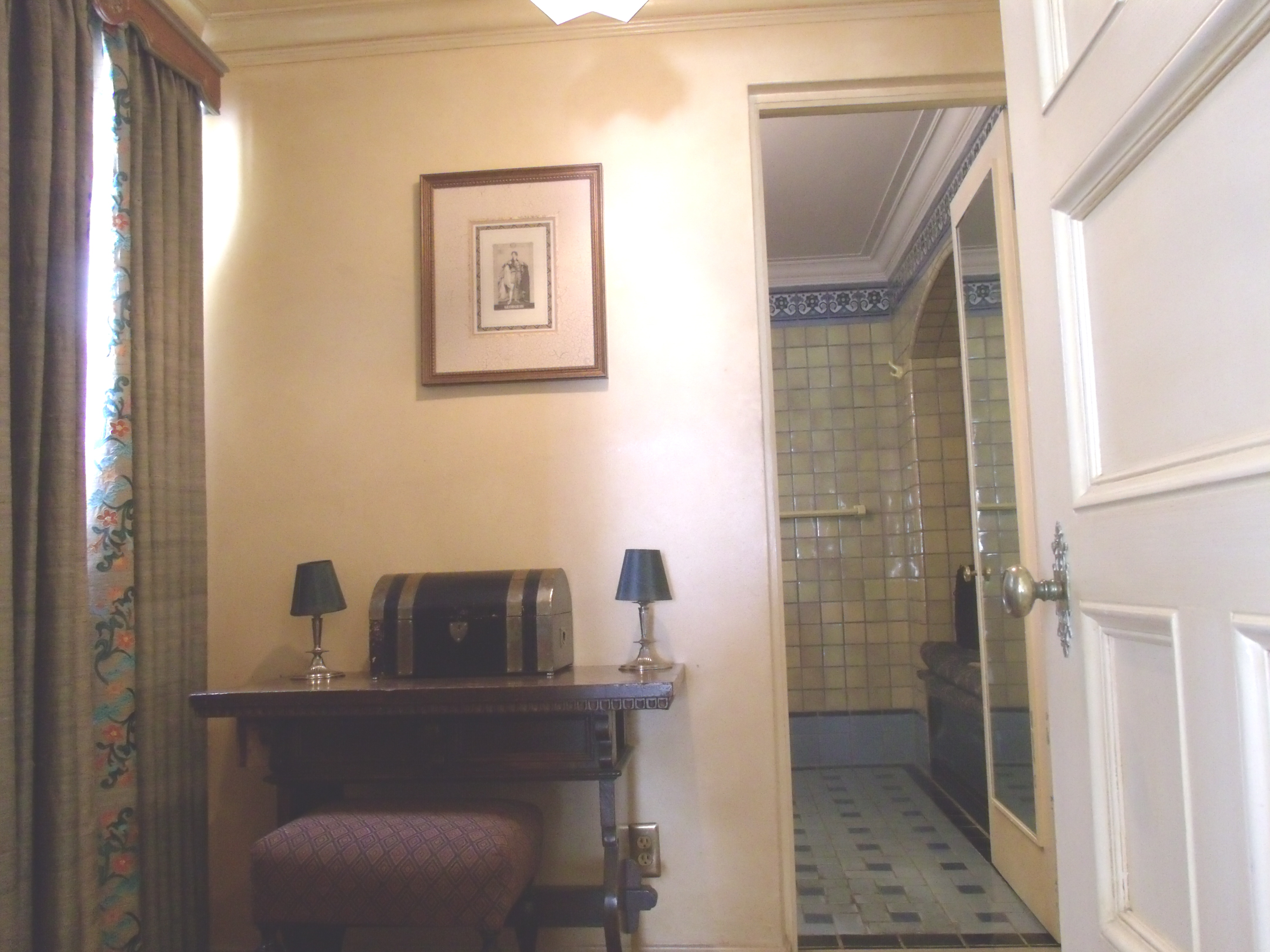
Bathroom adjacent to the "Elvis Presley room"

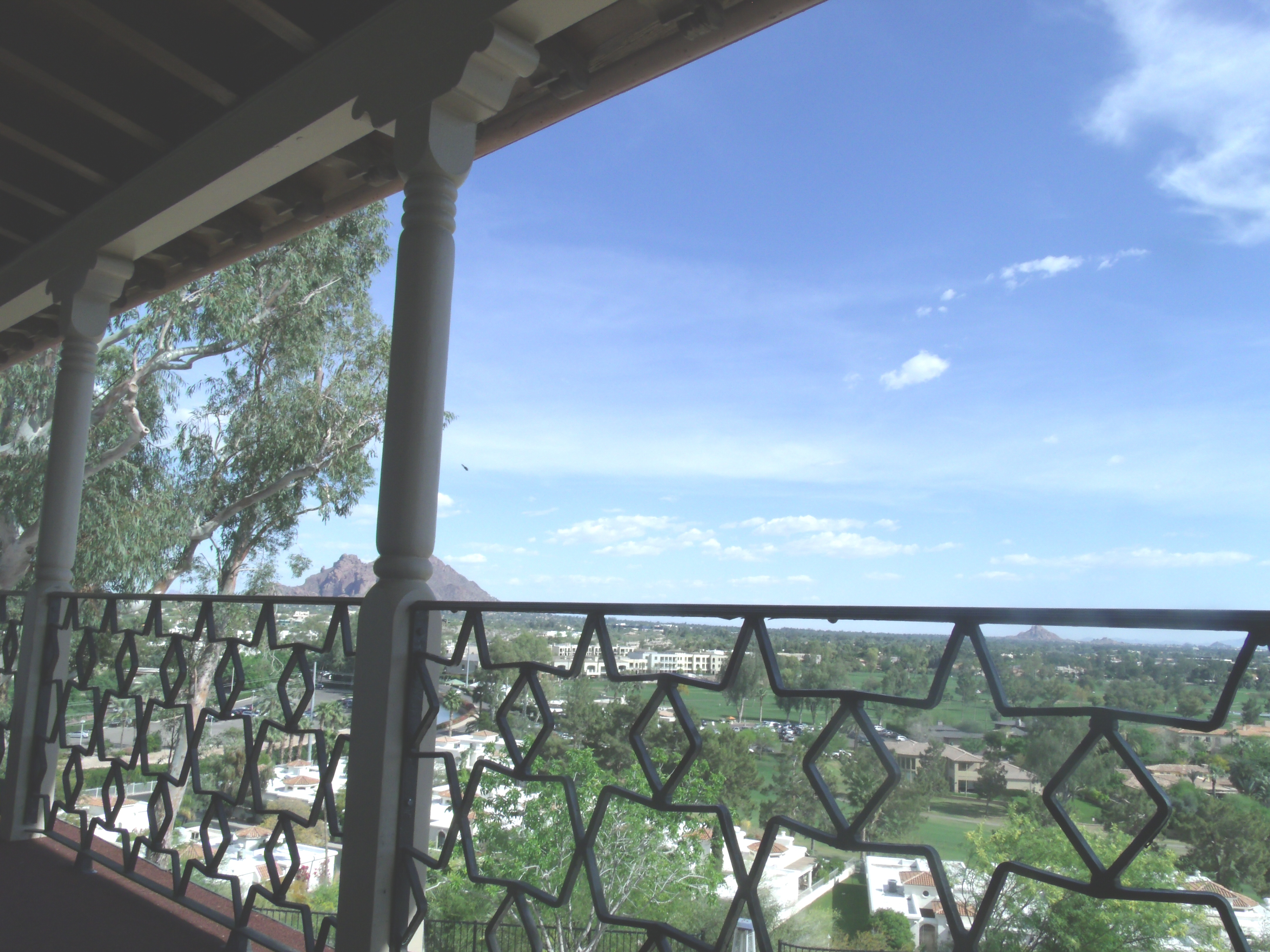
View from a second floor balcony

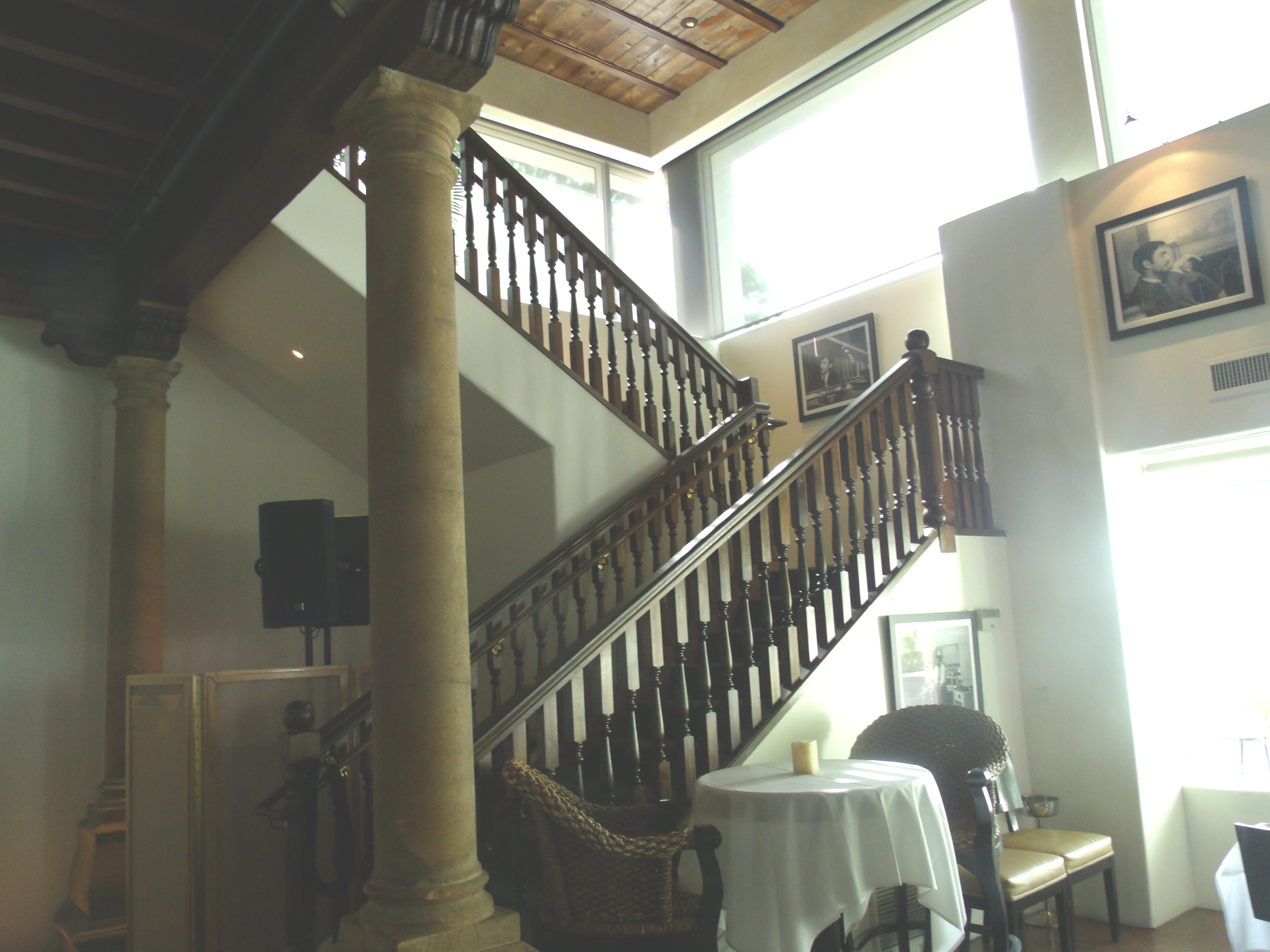
View of another interior staircase

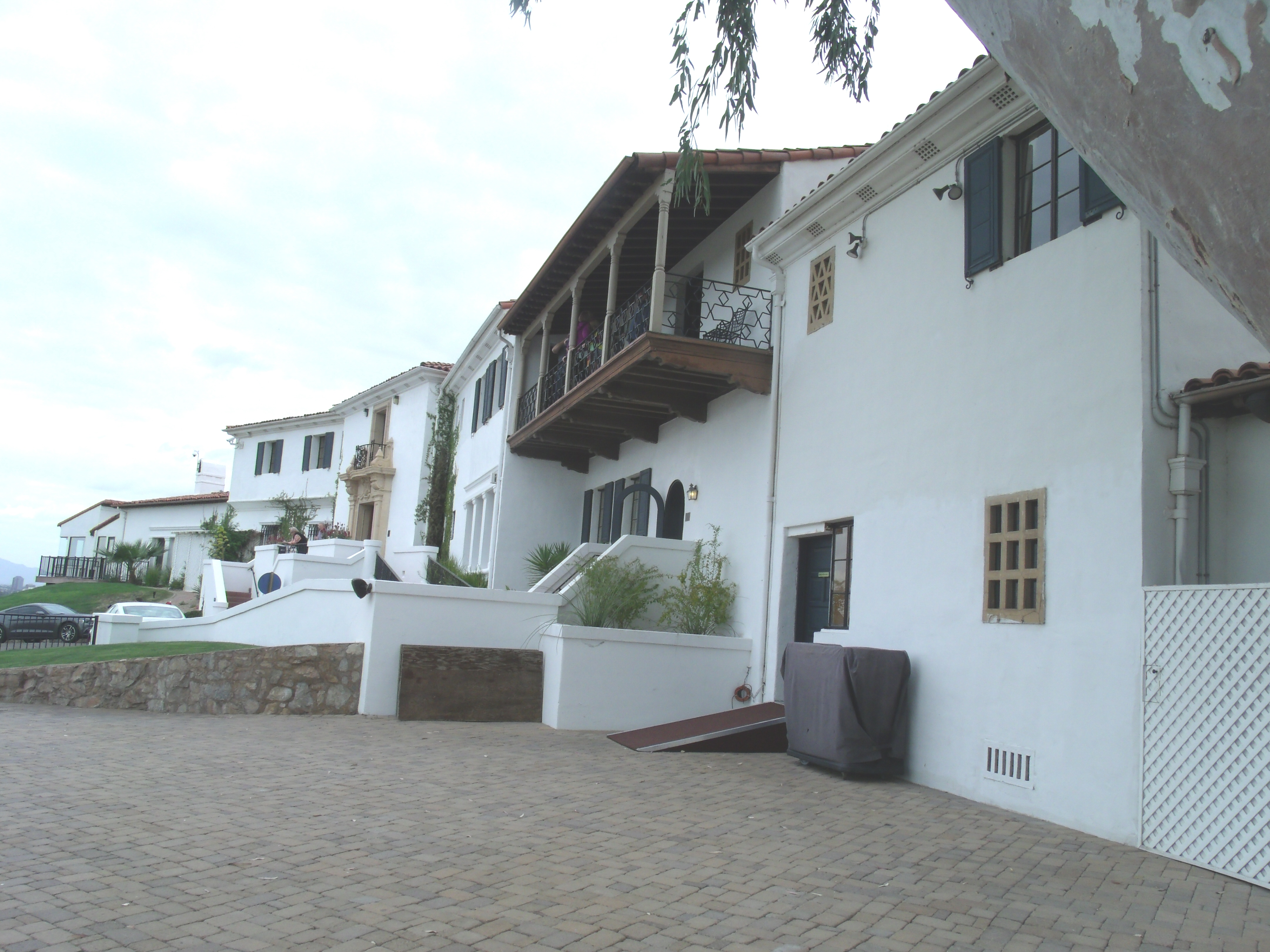
Side facade

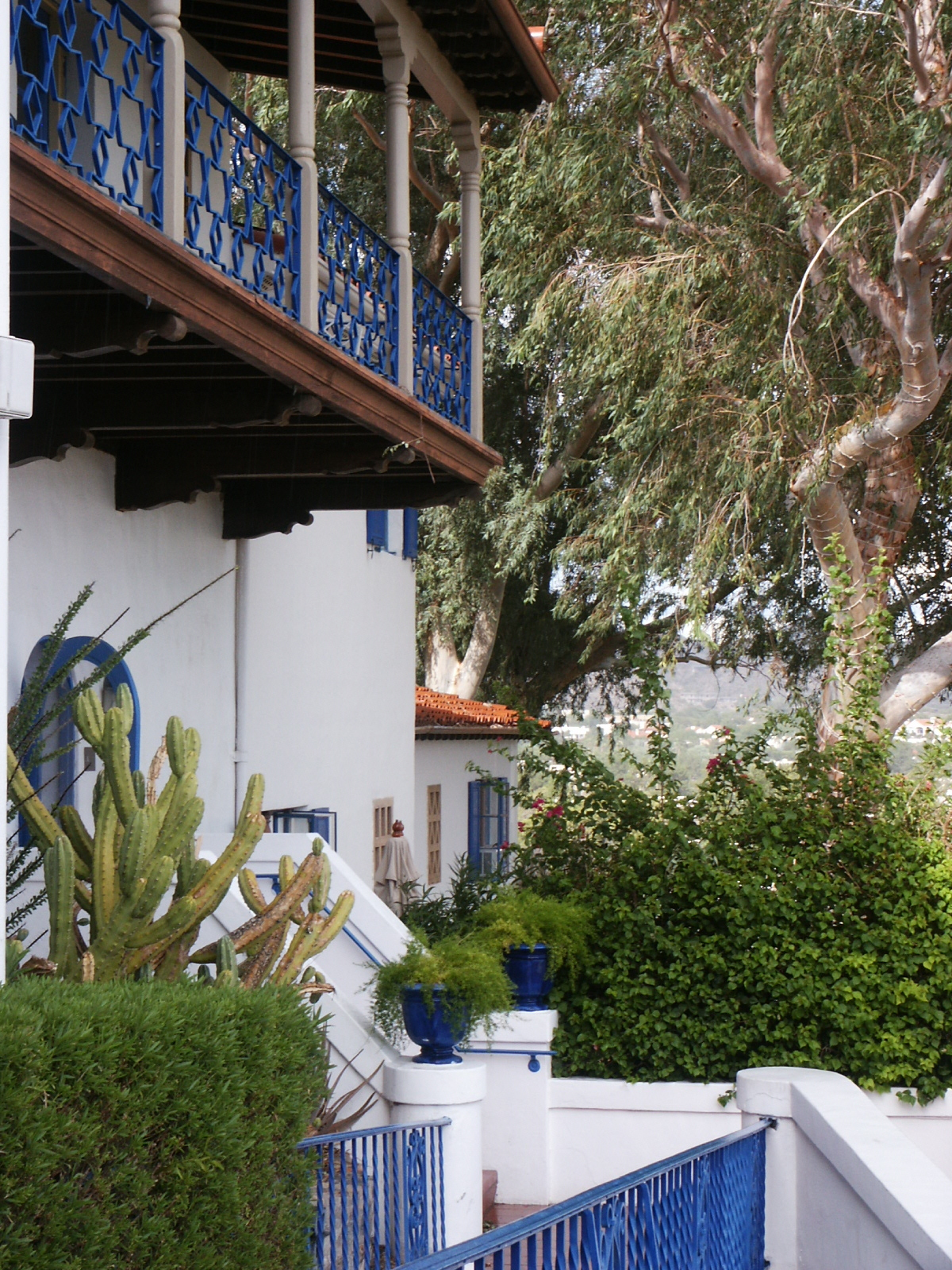
Gardens and second floor balcony

== See also ==
- List of historic properties in Phoenix
- National Register of Historic Places listings in Phoenix
- Phoenix Historic Property Register
- Houses in Phoenix, Arizona
