= William Wrigley Jr. II =

American businessman

- Born: October 6, 1963 (age 62)
- Education: Phoenix Country Day School
- Alma mater: Duke University; University of Pennsylvania
- Occupation: Businessman
- Spouse: Sue Hostetler
- Children: 4
- Parent: William Wrigley III

William Wrigley Jr. (born October 6, 1963) is an American billionaire businessman, and CEO of Parallel, a company that sells cannabis products. He is the former chairman and CEO of the Wm. Wrigley Jr. Company.

== Early life ==
Wrigley is the son of Alison (Hunter) and William Wrigley III (1933–1999), the grandson of Philip K. Wrigley (1894–1977) and the great-grandson of William Wrigley Jr. (1861–1932).

Wrigley graduated from the Phoenix Country Day School in Phoenix, Arizona. He received his undergraduate degree from Duke University in 1985 and his MBA from the Wharton School of the University of Pennsylvania.

== Career ==
Under his leadership, the company expanded beyond chewing gum by purchasing Altoids and Life Savers from Kraft Foods' candy division in addition to Spanish confectionery company Joyco.

He turned over the office of CEO to William Perez in October 2006. Perez, former CEO of Nike and SC Johnson, was the first non-Wrigley head of the company.

== Timeline at Wrigley Co ==
- Joined in 1985
- Director since 1988
- Vice President (1991–1998)
- Senior Vice President (1999)
- President & Chief Executive Officer (1999–2006)
- Chairman of the Board since 2004
- Executive Chairman since 2006
- Retired in 2008
