= Island Mountain Railway =

Former funicular railway at Santa Catalina Island, California

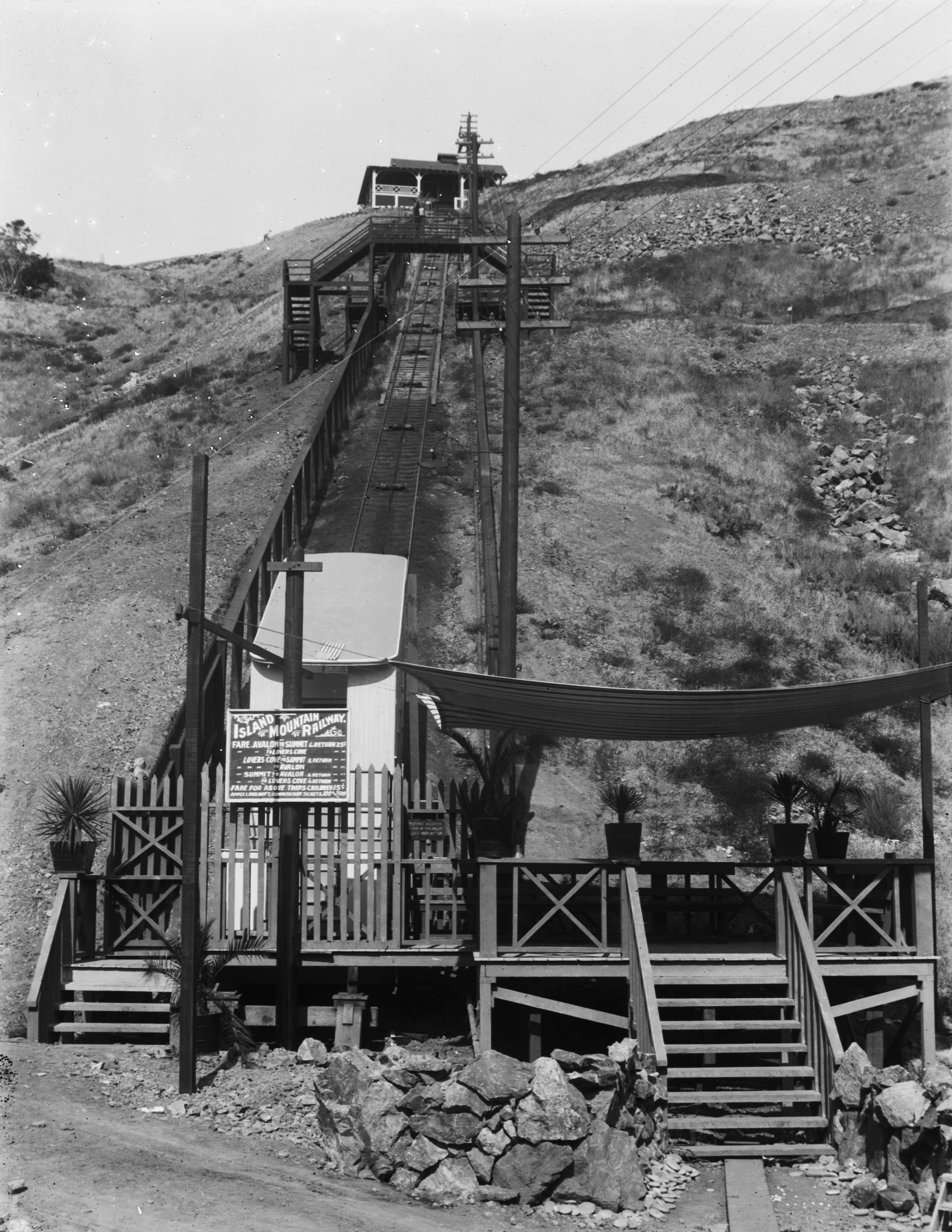

Overview
- Locale: Avalon, California; United States
- Transit type: Funicular

Operation
- Began operation: January 1, 1904

The Island Mountain Railway (Santa Catalina Island Incline Railway, or Angel's Flight) was a funicular railway at the resort town of Avalon on Santa Catalina Island, off the coast of California. The railway was unique because it not only ran from Avalon's amphitheater to the top of a nearby mountain but it also ran down the mountain's other side to Lovers' Cove. At the time of the railroad's operation Santa Catalina Island was a popular seaside destination. The railway opened in 1904 and closed in 1918, reopening in 1921 and closing again in 1923.

A single car carried passengers up from the amphitheater in Avalon to the top of the hill overlooking Avalon. A second car ran down the other side of the hill to Pebble Beach, in Lover's Cove.

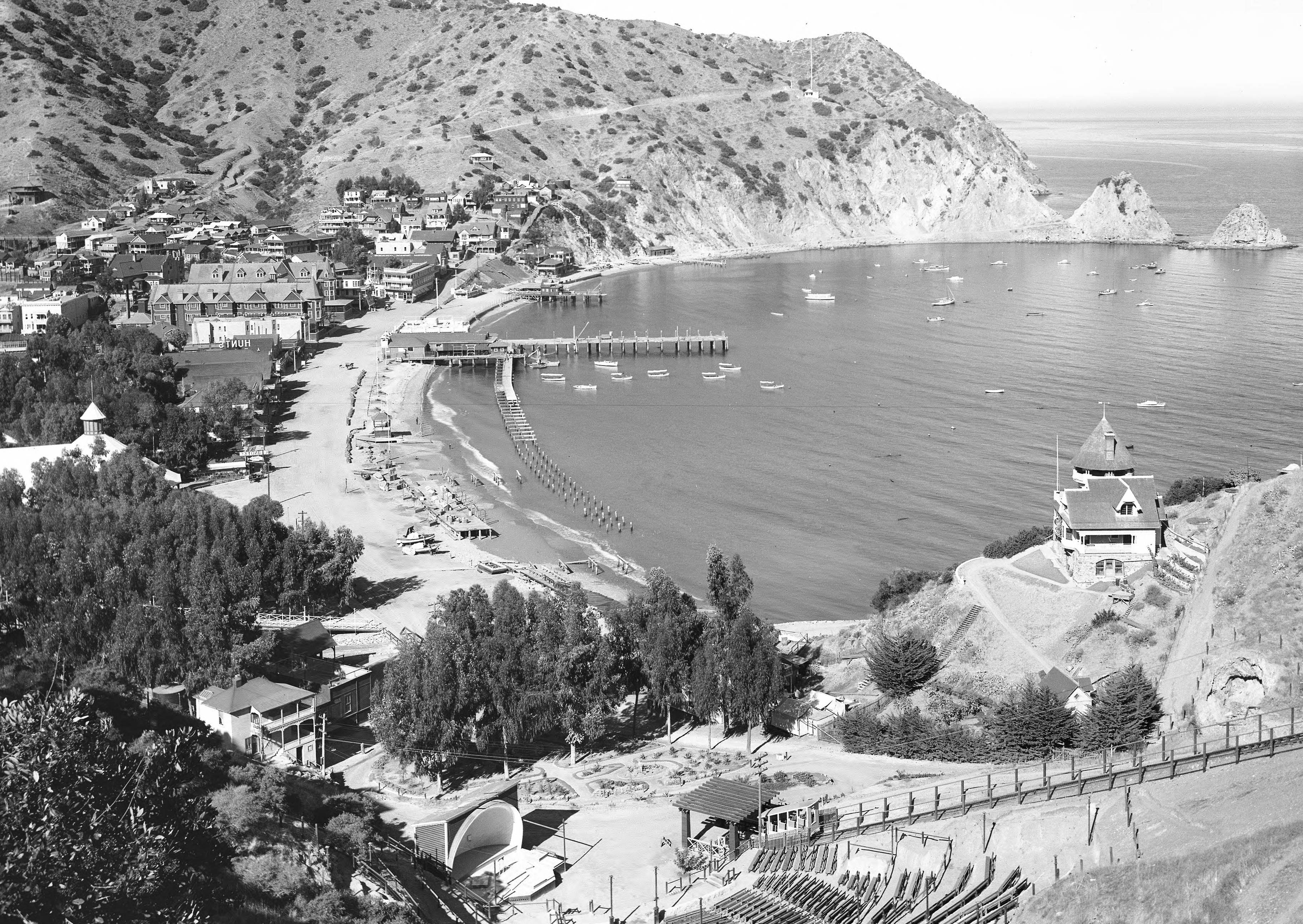
The railroad's station at the Avalon amphitheater, ca. 1914

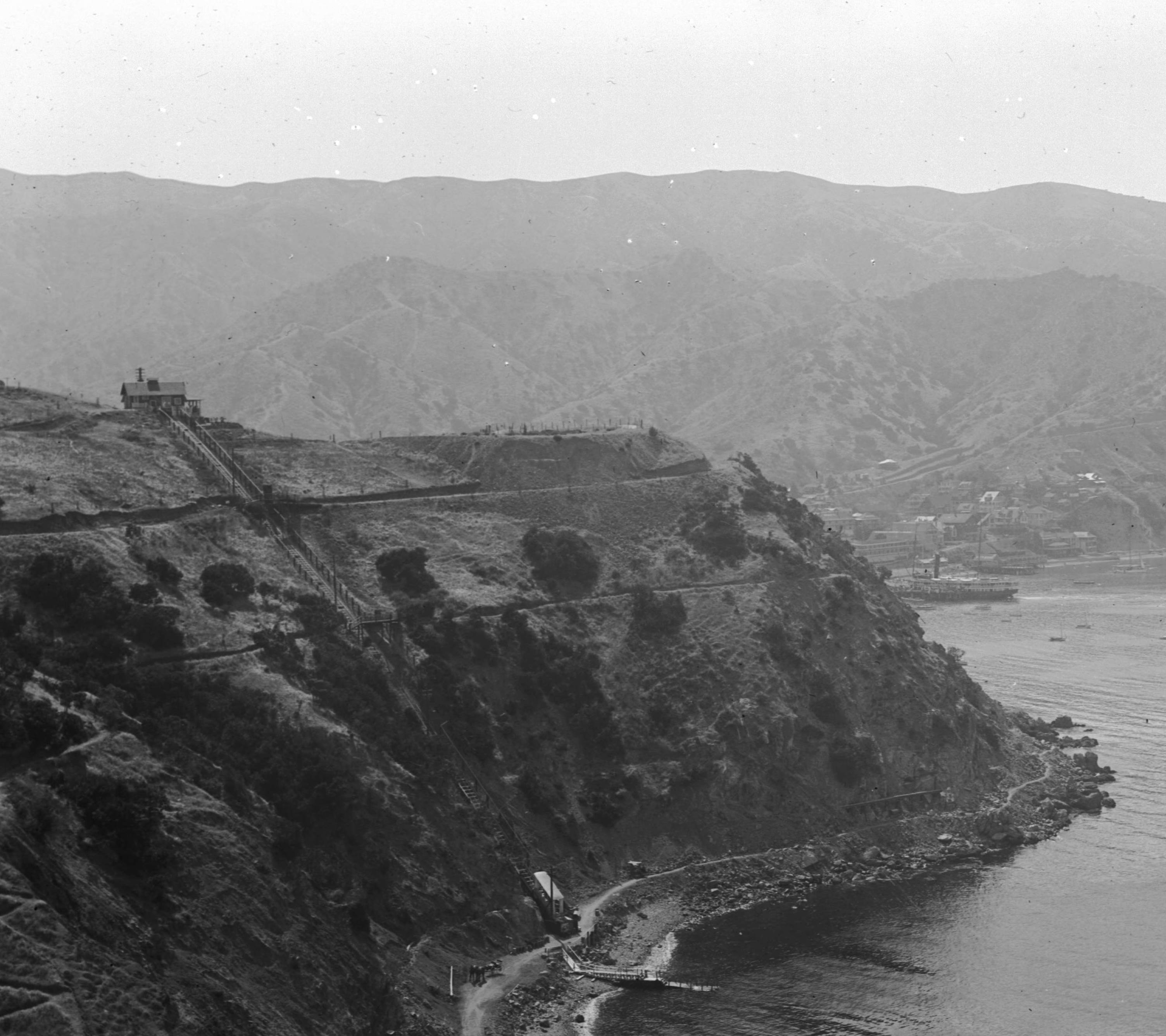
View of the railroad from the south at Stage Road above Lover's Cove, ca. 1905

== See also ==
- List of funicular railways
