= George Shatto =

American real estate developer (1850–1893)

George Rufus Shatto
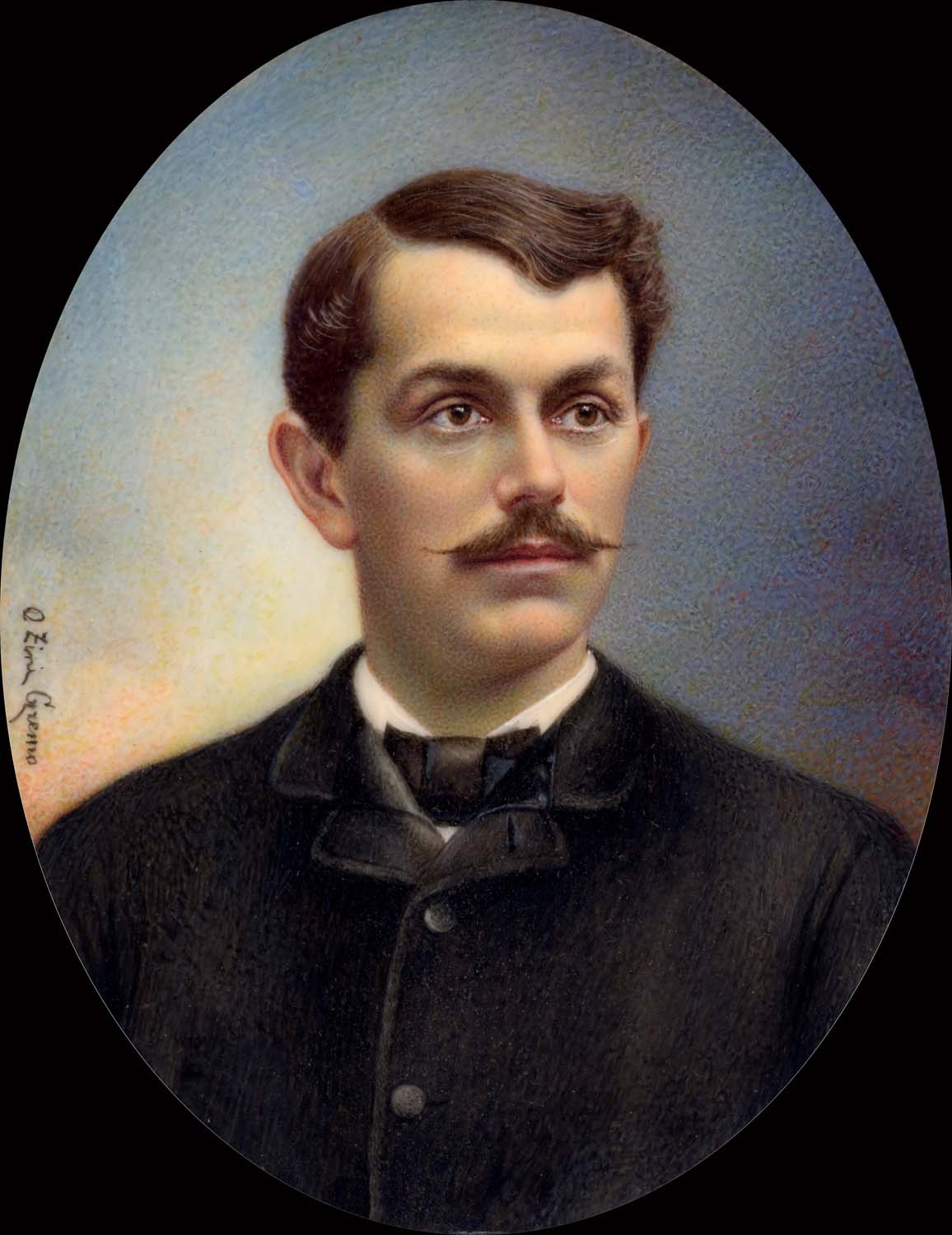
- Portrait of George Shatto
- Born: August 15, 1850; Medina County, Ohio, US
- Died: May 30, 1893 (aged 42); Ravenna, California, US
- Occupation: Real estate developer

George Rufus Shatto (August 15, 1850 – May 30, 1893) was an American real estate developer. He was an early land investor in Los Angeles, California. In 1887 he purchased Santa Catalina Island, California and was the first person to attempt to develop it into a resort destination.

== Biography ==
Shatto was born in Medina County, Ohio. He married Clara Ruth Alward "Clarissa" Whitney in Flint, Michigan on August 15, 1876. They had one child together, Walter Ohl Shatto, who died eight months after his birth in 1881.

Shatto worked as real-estate developer in Grand Rapids, Michigan, though many of his investments were in Los Angeles, California. In 1887 he bought Santa Catalina Island, California from the estate of James Lick for a price of $150,000. Shatto planned to develop the bay town then known as Timm's Landing into a resort destination and to lease out other areas of the island for mining and ranching. Shatto surveyed the bay, laid out the streets, and subdivided the land into lots from $150 to $2,000. The original maps called the new town Shatto, but, at the advice of sister-in-law Etta Marilla Whitney, the name was changed to Avalon in reference to the epic poem by Lord Alfred Tennyson. The town of Avalon, California bears that name to this day.

Between the years of 1887 and 1888, Shatto had a steamship pier and the original Hotel Metropole, built. The island was first opened for tourists during the next summer season of 1888. Financial troubles forced Shatto to close the Hotel Metropole for the 1891 season, and in 1891, the island was foreclosed, and ownership reverted to the James Lick Trust.

In 1892, Shatto built a Queen Anne style mansion in Los Angeles at the corner of Lucas Street and Orange Street (later Wilshire Boulevard). This location would later become the site of the Good Samaritan Hospital in Los Angeles.

Shatto died on May 30, 1893, when the freight train he was riding was involved in a crash with another freight train near Ravenna, California. Shatto was riding in the caboose at the time of the crash. Several other passengers were injured, though no one else died. Shatto's body was returned to Los Angeles for burial.
