= Catalina Flyer =

500-passenger catamaran ferry

Coordinates: 33°20′40″N 118°19′19″W

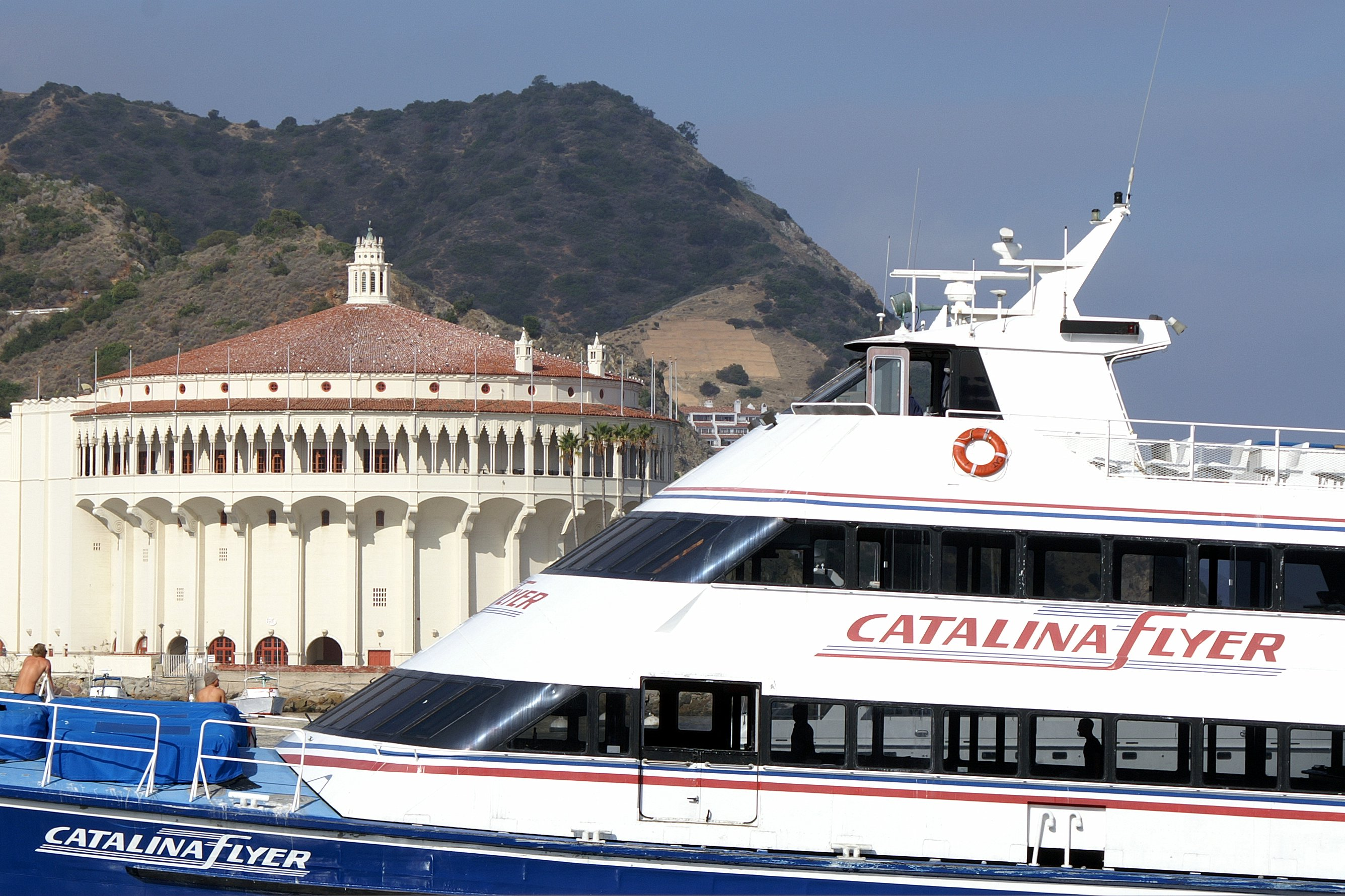
- The Catalina Flyer, with the Catalina Casino in the background

History
- Name: Catalina Flyer (1988–present)
- Operator: Catalina Passenger Service
- Port of registry: Newport Beach, US
- Route: Newport Beach, CA - Avalon, CA
- Builder: Nichols Bros. Boat Builders
- Yard number: S-88
- Launched: 1988
- Identification: MMSI number: 367001740; Callsign: WTD8887
- Status: In service

General characteristics
- Length: 36 m (118 ft 1 in)
- Beam: 12.2 m (40 ft 0 in)
- Draught: 2.44 m (8 ft 0 in)
- Installed power: 2x MTU 16v 4000 M64 1999kw
- Propulsion: Propellers
- Speed: 27 knots (50 km/h; 31 mph)
- Capacity: 600 passengers
- Crew: 2 captains + 6 deckhands

Catalina Flyer is a 350-passenger catamaran ferry operated by Catalina Passenger Service.

It has provided daily passenger service since 1988 from the Balboa Pavilion in Newport Beach, California to the city of Avalon located on Santa Catalina Island. Prior to 1988, the same run was served by the Island Holiday from the mid-1950s until 1978, and the Catalina Holiday from 1978 until 1988, both also operated by Catalina Passenger Service.

The Catalina Flyer is the largest passenger-carrying catamaran on the West Coast of the United States and at the time it was launched it was the largest in North America. It carries an eight-person crew, and features a sundeck, full-service lounges and large view windows.

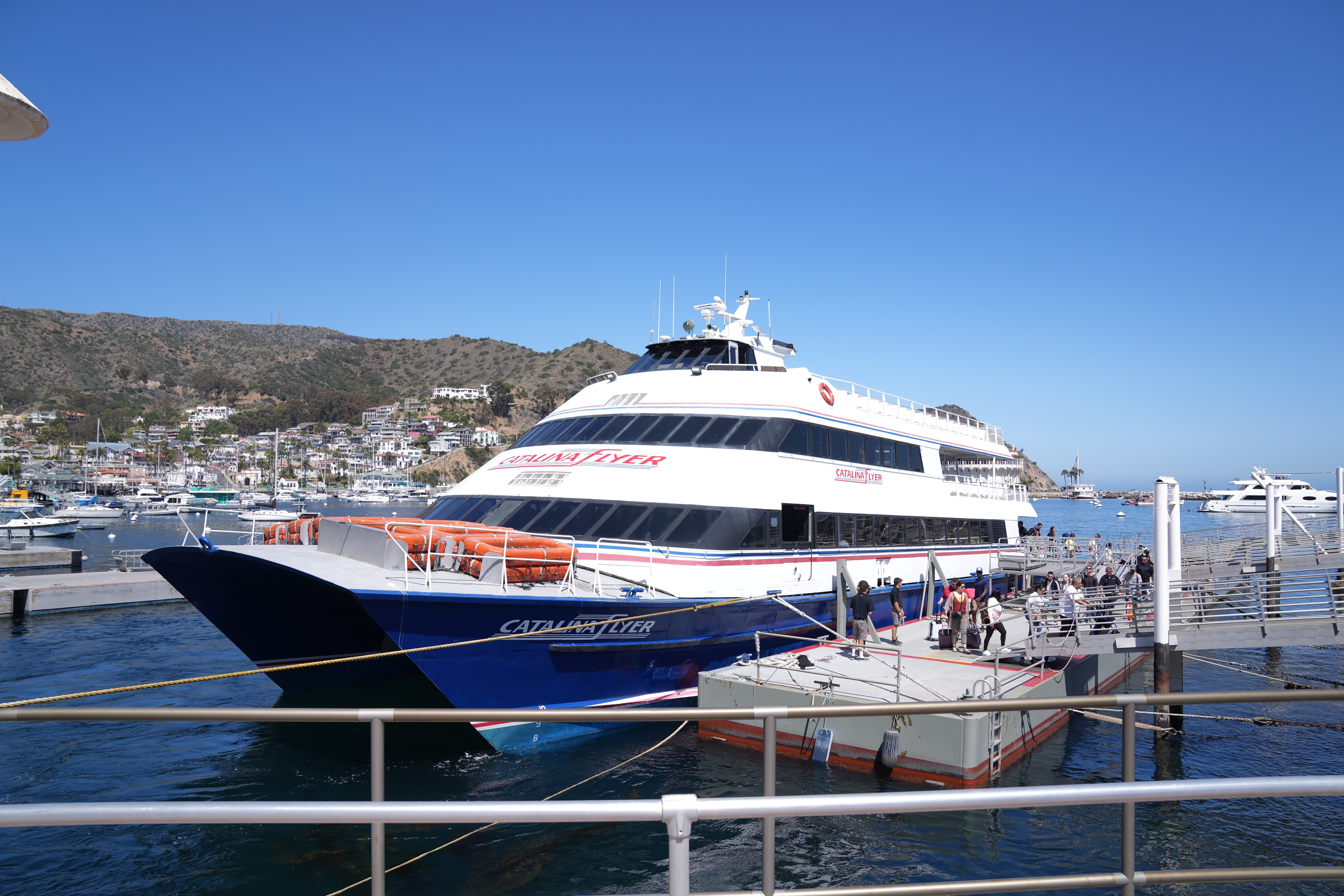
Catalina Flyer passengers coming ashore at Catalina Islaland.

The Catalina Flyer makes one round trip daily, leaving Newport Beach for Avalon in the morning and returning from Avalon to Newport Beach in the early evening. It takes approximately 75 minutes for a one way trip. In addition to regular passenger service, the vessel is also available for private charter.

In the fall and winter of 2010–2011, the Flyer's service was temporarily suspended, in order to upgrade the ship's engines to meet the environmental requirements of California's Commercial Harbor Craft Regulation.

From October 2022 to November 2023, the Catalina Flyer underwent an extensive refit at Nichols Brother Boat Builders (the original builder of the vessel). The engines were upgraded to MTU 16v4000 m64 EPA tier 3 units. The interior cabin was fitted with USA built seats made by UES seating. And the hull and structure was extensively refurbished.

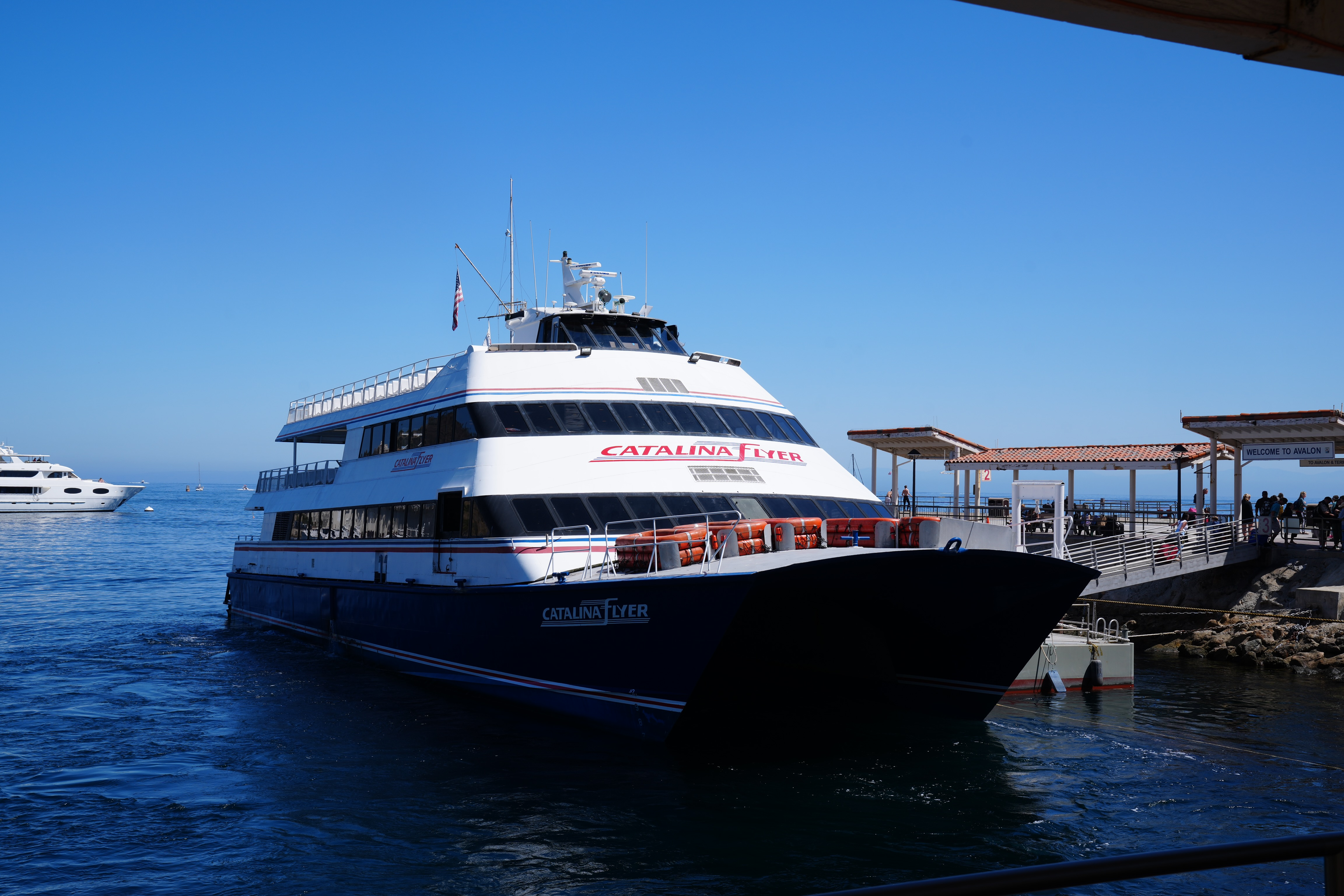
The Catalina Flyer

== See also ==
- Catalina Express, a different ferry service to Catalina from San Pedro, Long Beach, and Dana Point
