= Long Beach Unified School District =

School district in California, United States

Location
- Southern California Long Beach, California; United States

District information
- Grades: K-12
- Established: 1885; 141 years ago
- Superintendent: Jill Baker
- Schools: 94

Other information
- Website: www.lbschools.net

The Long Beach Unified School District is a school district headquartered in Long Beach, California, United States. Established in 1885, Long Beach Unified School District educates 64,000 students in 84 public schools in the cities of Long Beach, Lakewood, Signal Hill, Carson, and Avalon on Catalina Island. The school district is the third largest in California and serves one of the most diverse large cities in the United States. The student population is 59.2 percent Hispanic, 12.2 percent African American, 11.9 percent white, 7.1 percent Asian, 5.4 percent multi-race, 1 percent Pacific Islander and 0.1 percent Native American. About two-thirds of the student population come from lower-income households and qualify for free and reduced price meals. The school district employs more than 8,000 people, making it the largest employer in Long Beach.

The district territory includes the vast majority of Long Beach, all of Signal Hill, and portions of Lakewood, as well as Santa Catalina Island, Avalon included. It has no territory in Carson, even though LBUSD operates one school, California Academy of Mathematics and Science, there.

== History ==
Long Beach High School, c. 1910

Many Long Beach schools were damaged in the 1933 earthquake. This contributed to the passage of the Field Act, strengthening the building standards of schools across the state.

As of 1993, several parents in the LBUSD boundaries enrolled their children in the Los Alamitos Unified School District day care program so that they could then use LBUSD district transfer rules, stating that parents may enroll their children at a school closest to their daycare provider even if the school is in another school district, to obtain an inter-district transfer from the Los Alamitos district and send their children to Los Alamitos schools. As a result, LBUSD was losing money, because state education funds were paid based on attendance. Horn said "It was never anyone's intention to make the (child-care) program a drawing card from other school districts. It did turn out that way." Gordon Dillow of the Los Angeles Times said "Although school officials say they do not track the racial make-up of their inter-district transfer students, the perception has been that many, perhaps most, of the Long Beach-to-Los Alamitos transfer students are Anglo." Whites were a minority in LBUSD, with 26% of the student body, while they were a majority at Los Alamitos USD, with 75% of the student body. In the 1992-1993 school year, 400 students who lived in LBUSD attended Los Alamitos schools because a parent was working at Los Alamitos schools or because of the after school program. Dillow said that while the loss of that number of students from LBUSD, with 76,000 students, "may not seem significant, but it does cause the school district to lose about $4,000 per year for each student in state education funding." LBUSD began investigating the idea of establishing before and after school programs at its schools so that parents could no longer use the loophole. LBUSD established a new after school program, "Kid's Club." 140 were enrolled in August 1993 and the district expected a total of 300 to be enrolled by the beginning of the school year.

On January 18, 1994, the LBUSD Board of Education voted to require school uniforms in all elementary and middle schools, with the wearing of school uniforms to start in September 1994. The district was the first large urban school district in the United States to require school uniforms. On August 23, 1994, SB 1269 the School Uniform Law was approved by the Governor of California to support schools that adopt a school-wide uniform policy, which also allowed parents to opt out of the policy. At LBUSD, roughly 2% of the students opt out of the uniform policy.

Since starting the uniform policy, LBUSD claimed assaults dropped by two-thirds, suspensions dropped by almost a third, vandalism dropped, attendance improved, and test scores increased. President Bill Clinton mentioned LBUSD's uniform policy in his 1996 State of the Union address. Numerous other large urban districts have now adopted school uniform policies.

Some researchers, including David Brunsma of the Sociology Department of University of Missouri, have said that the benefits ascribed to the implementation of the LBUSD uniform policy were logically attributable to other factors; such as increased school security, collateral attendance enforcement efforts, and in-class programs designed to bolster sagging test scores.

LBUSD now has two high schools, Woodrow Wilson Classical High School, and Millikan High School, that require school uniforms as well.

In 1999, Jefferson Leadership Academies became the first public middle school in the United States to convert entirely to single gender classes. Only a few dozen more schools have followed this trend, mostly because of Title IX of the 1972 Education Act, which prohibits sex discrimination in federally funded programs. The school has plans to discontinue the program after scheduling conflicts and disappointing test scores.

In 2001, there was a movement to form a Lakewood Unified School District. Because students in the city of Lakewood are currently divided between four different school districts (ABC Unified School District, Bellflower Unified School District, Paramount Unified School District and LBUSD), a petition was started. After gathering the required number of petition signatures and an LA County review, the issue went before the California State Board of Education. The board rejected the petition on February 8, 2001 because the board said the proposed district failed to meet four of the state's nine criteria for new district formation. With that setback, the most current plans (as of 2005) are to try to merge those areas of Lakewood served by Paramount into either the Bellflower or Long Beach Unified School Districts.

== District awards ==
LBUSD was the 2003 winner of the $1 million Broad Prize for Urban Education. The Broad Prize was the largest education prize in the country awarded to urban school districts. In 2004, LBUSD received a second grant from the Broad Foundation for $1.14 million to continue their efforts to improve the organization of the district's schools using Baldrige strategies. In 2004, the Broad Foundation also awarded 55 Long Beach Unified School District seniors $500,000 in scholarships as Broad Prize Scholars. LBUSD has gone on to receive nominations for the award three more times and once prior to winning (2002, 2006, 2007, 2008).

== Unusual schools ==
Two Harbors Elementary School, at Two Harbors on Catalina Island, was a one-room school. Enrollment in 2005 was 12 students. In 2014, the Two Harbors one-room schoolhouse closed due to low enrollment, and students now go to Avalon School on the other side of the island in Avalon, which is a 45-minute to 1-hour drive. Previously the district had planned to close the school in fall 2005, but Two Harbors residents and visitors raised enough money to keep the school open.

== List of schools ==
=== Elementary schools ===
- Addams Elementary School
- Alvarado Elementary School
- Barton Elementary School
- Birney Elementary School
- Bixby Elementary School
- Bryant Elementary School
- Burbank Elementary School
- Burcham Elementary School
- Carver Elementary School
- Chavez Elementary School
- Cleveland Elementary School
- Dooley Elementary School
- Edison Elementary School
- Emerson Parkside Academy
- Fremont Elementary School
- Gant Elementary School
- Garfield Elementary School
- Gompers Elementary School
- Grant Elementary School
- Harte Elementary School
- Henry Dual Immersion School
- Herrera Elementary School
- Holmes Elementary School
- Kettering Elementary School
- King Elementary School
- Lafayette Elementary School
- Lincoln Elementary School
- Longfellow Elementary School
- Los Cerritos Elementary School
- Lowell Elementary School
- MacArthur Elementary School
- Madison Elementary School
- Mann Elementary School
- McKinley Elementary School
- Naples Bayside Academy
- Oropeza Elementary School
- Prisk Elementary School
- Riley Elementary School
- Roosevelt Elementary School
- Signal Hill Elementary School
- Smith Elementary School
- Stevenson Elementary School
- Twain Elementary School
- Webster Elementary School
- Whittier Elementary School
- Willard Elementary School

=== K-8 schools ===
- Cubberley School
- John Muir Academy
- Newcomb Academy
- Powell Academy
- Robinson Academy
- Tincher Preparatory School

=== K-12 schools ===
- Avalon School in Avalon on Catalina Island (Divided into elementary, junior high, and high schools, but with a single principal)

=== Middle schools ===
- Bancroft Middle School
- Franklin Classical Middle School
- Hamilton Middle School
- Hoover Middle School
- Hughes Middle School
- Jefferson Leadership Academies
- Keller Dual Immersion Middle School
- Lindbergh STEM Academy
- Lindsey Academy
- Marshall Academy of the Arts
- Nelson Academy
- Rogers Middle School
- Stanford Middle School
- Stephens Middle School
- Washington Middle School

=== High schools ===
==== Comprehensive High Schools ====
Woodrow Wilson Classical High School

- Cabrillo High School
- Jordan High School
- Lakewood High School
- Long Beach Polytechnic High School
- Millikan High School
- Wilson Classical High School

==== Other high schools ====
- Beach High School/Long Beach School for Adults
- Browning High School
- California Academy of Mathematics and Science (CAMS)
  [on the CSU Dominguez Hills campus]
- Renaissance High School for the Arts
- Educational Partnership High School (EPHS)
- Reid Continuation High School
- McBride High School
- Sato Academy of Mathematics and Science

=== Charter schools ===
- Intellectual Virtues Academy
- Clear Passage Educational Center

=== Other schools ===
- Buffum Total Learning Center
- Tucker Transitional Center
- Long Beach School for Adults

=== Former schools ===
- Buffum Elementary School

(Converted to Buffum Total Learning Center)

- Constellation Community Charter Middle School

(Closed due to low enrollment)

- Burroughs Elementary School

(Now used as a District-wide Teacher Resources Center and Head Start Program Offices)

- Butler Middle School

(Closed and Students Transferred to Nelson Academy)

- Monroe K-8 School

(Now used as Personnel Commission Office)

- New City School/Colegio New City

(Closed due to low test scores)

- DeMille Middle School

(Closed and Demolished in 2011, campus now houses McBride High School)

- Hill Middle School

(Closed in 2016, Campus now houses Sato Academy of Mathematics and Science)

- Keller Elementary School

(Converted to Keller Dual Immersion Middle School)

- Hi-Hill Outdoor School (informally known as Camp Hi-Hill), formerly a privately owned resort known as Opid's Camp, is located on 13 acres (53,000 m^{2}) of land in Angeles National Forest in a deep canyon below Mount Wilson and permitted to the district by the Forest Service. The camp allowed urban students to experience a week of outdoor education. The first class of sixth graders was on April 19, 1948. More recently, fifth graders traditionally spent a week at Camp Hi-Hill. Unfortunately, due to cost and increasing fire risk, the school district closed the camp in 2008 and it remains vacant as of 2016.

== See also ==
- List of school districts in Los Angeles County, California
