= Catalina Express =

American passenger ferry service

Coordinates: 33.749675°N 118.278716°W

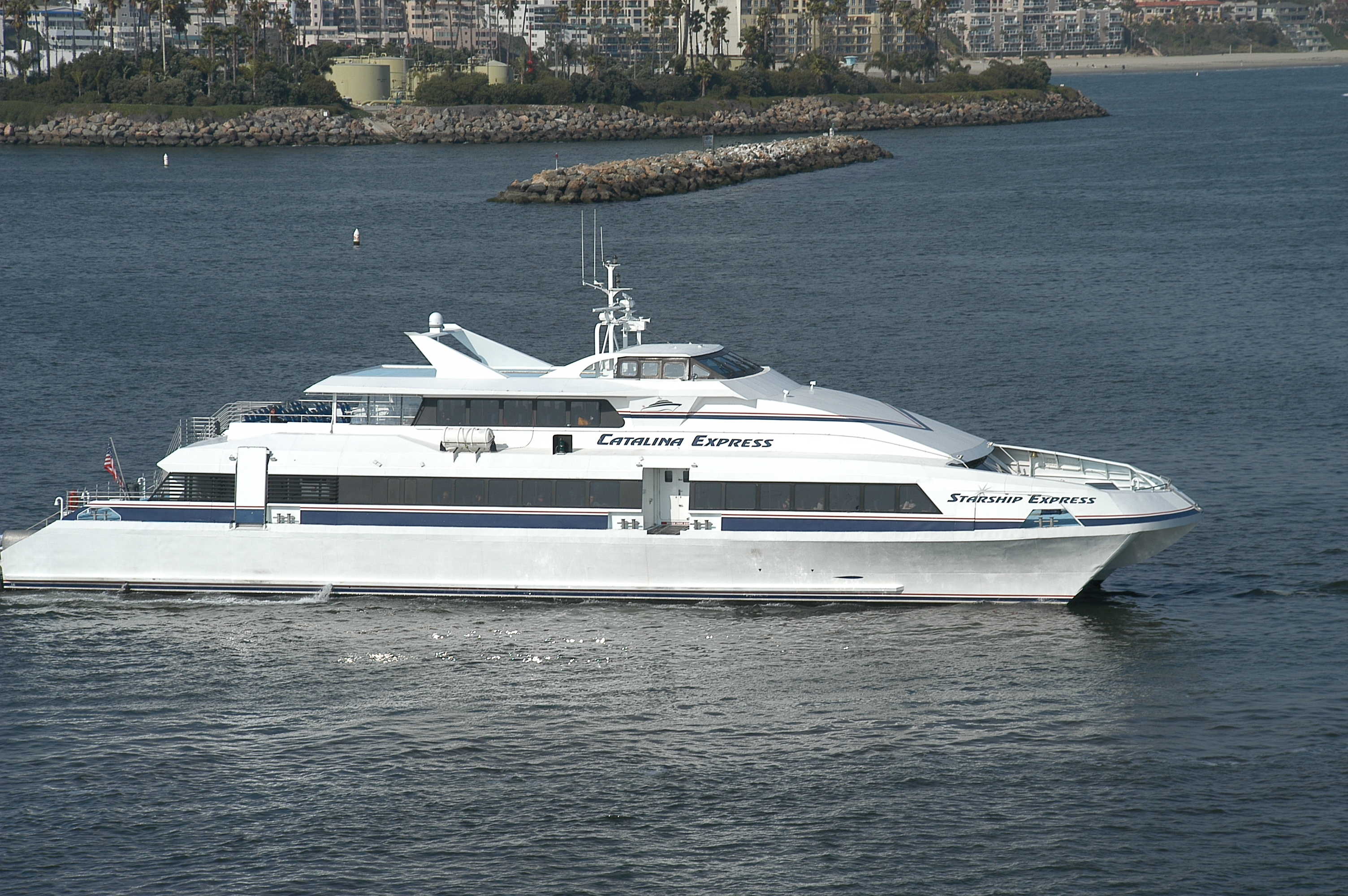
- Catalina Express' Starship Express ferry, 2008
- Locale: Santa Catalina Island and mainland California
- Waterway: Gulf of Santa Catalina
- Transit type: Passenger ferry
- Began operation: 1981; 44 years ago
- No. of lines: 4
- No. of vessels: 8
- No. of terminals: 5
- Website: catalinaexpress.com

Catalina Channel Express, branded as simply Catalina Express, is an American passenger ferry service that operates scheduled trips between Santa Catalina Island and mainland California. The company began service in 1981 with a single sixty-passenger vessel. Its fleet includes eight high-speed vessels that can make the roughly 30-mile (48 km) crossing in approximately from an hour to 90 minutes, depending on the route.

== History ==
The company was started as Catalina Channel Express in 1981 by Doug Bombard with the help of his son Greg and friend Tom Rutter. The trio was looking for a way to bring guests to Two Harbors on the isthmus of the island. They purchased a sport fishing boat called the Check Mate that had operated out of Portland, Oregon. The vessel was refitted with a new enclosed passenger cabin with seats for 55 passengers purchased from Continental Airlines, new engines, a roll-control system, and was re-christened the Catalina Express.

The new vessel was used on a year-round, regular schedule with three round-trips per day. The boat would depart San Pedro at 6 am to get commuters to Avalon by 8, then it would head back to San Pedro, arriving at 9:30. Then the boat would load up hunters and campers and depart for Two Harbors at Noon, and return to San Pedro at 2 pm. Then the boat would make another run to Avalon and back starting at 4:30 pm. The consistent service quickly became popular among island residents.

After that, the fleet grew rapidly. By 1983, the company added the 149-passenger Avalon Express to the fleet to enable more runs with more passengers. In 1985, the company was able to expand to four vessels with two more 149-passenger boats, the Two Harbors Express and a new Catalina Express, and the original 55-passenger vessel renamed the Channel Express. In 1989, the Super Express joined the fleet, followed by the new Avalon Express in 1990. These 149-passenger vessels each had larger engines that could top out at 32 knots (59 km/h; 37 mph) and cut the 90-minute crossing down to just one hour. Also around 1990, Catalina Express opened a new port near the bow of the Queen Mary in Long Beach.

In 1991, the company started its first experiment operating a catamaran, the Jet Cat Express. The 360-passenger vessel could make the crossing in one hour using water jets instead of propellers. However, in 1994, the company made the choice to replace the Jet Cat Express, the Two Harbors Express and the Catalina Express (1985) with the Islander Express and a new Catalina Express, that could make the 32-knot speed necessary to make the crossing in one hour.

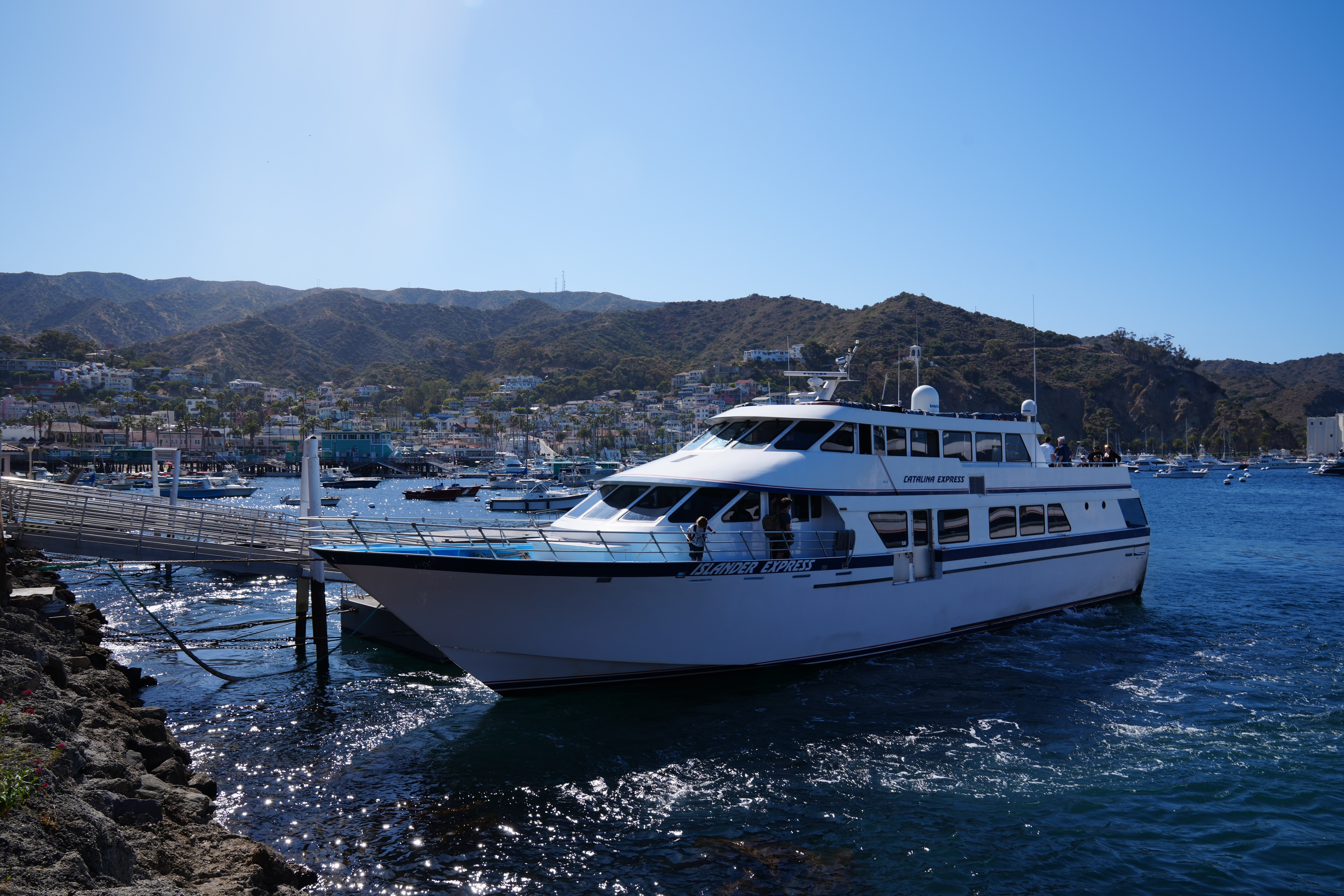
The Catalina Express’ Islander Express at Catalina Island.

In the summer of 1998, Catalina Express added service to Dana Point, and in early 2000 the company moved into the Catalina Landing in Downtown Long Beach, originally built by Crowley Maritime for its Catalina Cruises.

By summer 1999, there was a rivalry brewing between Catalina Cruises and Catalina Express. In May, Catalina Cruises launched the Catalina Jet, a 450-passenger, 36-knot catamaran that made the trip from Long Beach in about 55 minutes. In June, Catalina Express launched the Starship Express, a 300-passenger, 37-knot catamaran that could make the crossing in about 45 to 55 minutes.

Catalina Cruises would cease operations in 2001 and sell the Catalina Jet to Catalina Express. In 2004, the company added Jet Cat Express, its fastest vessel, capable of operating at 42 knots (78 km/h; 48 mph).

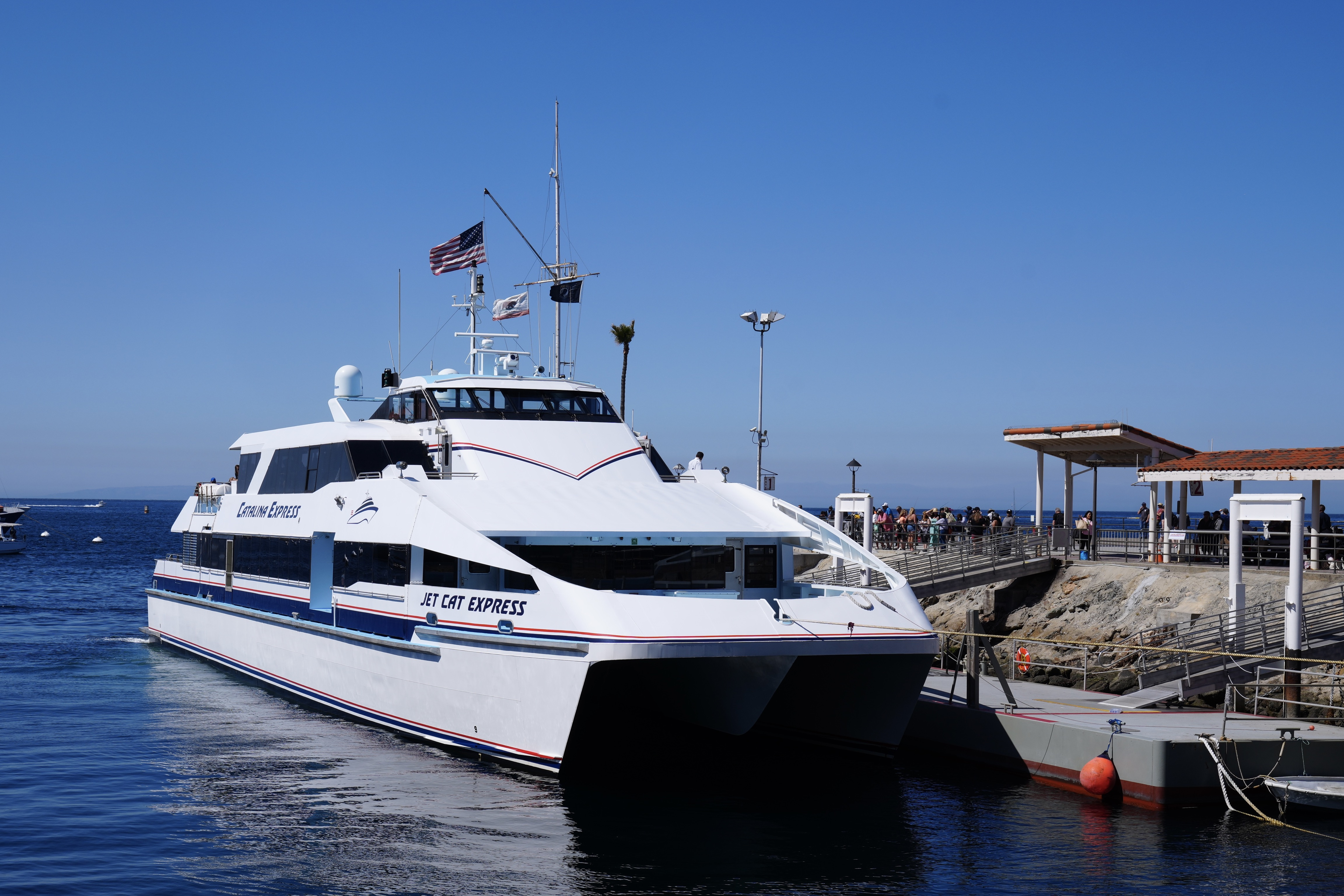
The Catalina Express Jet Cat Express at Catalina Island.

== Operations ==
Catalina Express operates year-round, and runs up to thirty round-trips a day. Transportation is provided to ports at Avalon and Two Harbors on Santa Catalina Island from the mainland California communities of San Pedro, Long Beach and Dana Point.

=== Ports ===
Catalina Express operates out of three harbors on the mainland:

- San Pedro: located at the Catalina Sea and Air Terminal at Berth 95 in the Port of Los Angeles. This is the only port to offer daily service to Two Harbors.
- Long Beach: located at the Catalina Landing, a terminal and office building development on the grounds of the old Navy Landing in Downtown Long Beach.
- Dana Point: located the offices of Dana Wharf Sportfishing in the Dana Point Harbor.

=== Routes ===
Name	Approximate trip duration
San Pedro/Avalon	75 min (1 hr, 15 min)
San Pedro/Two Harbors	75 min (1 hr, 15 min)
Long Beach/Avalon	60 min (1 hr)
Dana Point/Avalon	90 min (1 hr, 30 min)

=== Fleet ===
The company began with only one vessel that held about 60 passengers. As of 2025, the company operates the following eight high-speed vessels:

Name	Type	Length (Feet)	Passenger Capacity	Top Speed	Built	Notes
Catalina Jet	Catamaran	144 feet (44 m)	450	37 knots (69 km/h; 43 mph)	1999	Originally built for Catalina Cruises which ceased operations in 2001
Starship Express	Catamaran	134 feet (41 m)	300	32 knots (59 km/h; 37 mph)	1999	
Jet Cat Express	Catamaran	145 feet (44 m)	381	34 knots (63 km/h; 39 mph)	2004	
Cat Express	Catamaran	97 feet (30 m)	350	28 knots (52 km/h; 32 mph)	1987	Purchased by Catalina Express in 1997
Islander Express	Monohull	97 feet (30 m)	149	32 knots (59 km/h; 37 mph)	1994	
Catalina Express	Monohull	97 feet (30 m)	149	32 knots (59 km/h; 37 mph)	1994	
Super Express	Monohull	95 feet (29 m)	149	30 knots (56 km/h; 35 mph)	1989	
Avalon Express	Monohull	95 feet (29 m)	149	30 knots (56 km/h; 35 mph)	1990	

== Related businesses ==
On April 1, 2016, Greg Bombard (one of the founders of Catalina Express) and his brother Tim, co-founded Avalon Freight Services with Harley Franco, the owner of Harley Marine, a local tug boat company. Avalon Freight Services holds the exclusive contract with the Catalina Island Company to use the dock and warehouse space on the eastern end of the island. The company uses a self-propelled landing craft, the Catalina Provider, along with a tug/ramp barge combination to transport freight between the island and San Pedro.

Catalina Express holds the contract to operate and manage the Aquabus and Aqualink ferry services of Long Beach Transit. The two routes operate around Long Beach Harbor and Alamitos Bay.

== See also ==
- Catalina Flyer, a competing ferry service to Catalina Island from Newport Beach
- List of ferry operators
- List of high-speed craft ferry routes
