= Isthmus of Catalina Island =

Landform in California, United States

Coordinates: 33°26′19″N 118°29′59″W

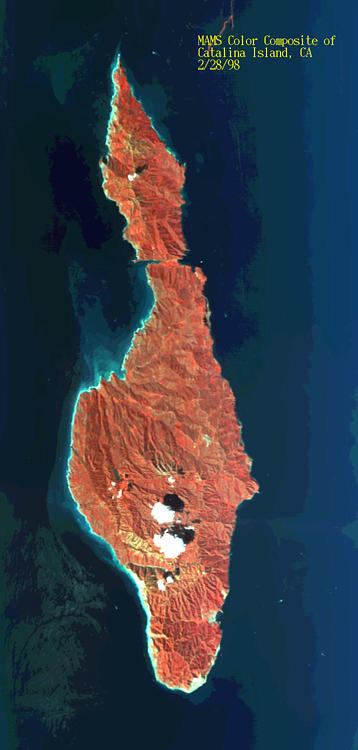
Infrared image of Catalina showing the Isthmus of Catalina near the western end of the island (top of image). Two Harbors is on the northern (leeward) side.

The Isthmus of Catalina Island is a 760-yard (690 m) segment of land that joins the northwestern portion of Santa Catalina Island, California to the main part of the island. It lies approximately 37 km (23 mi) southwest of San Pedro Harbor. Part of the isthmus is occupied by the town of Two Harbors, named for two harbors on either side of the isthmus, Isthmus Cove and Catalina Harbor. Two Harbors lies on the northern side, facing Isthmus Cove.
