= Avalon School (California) =

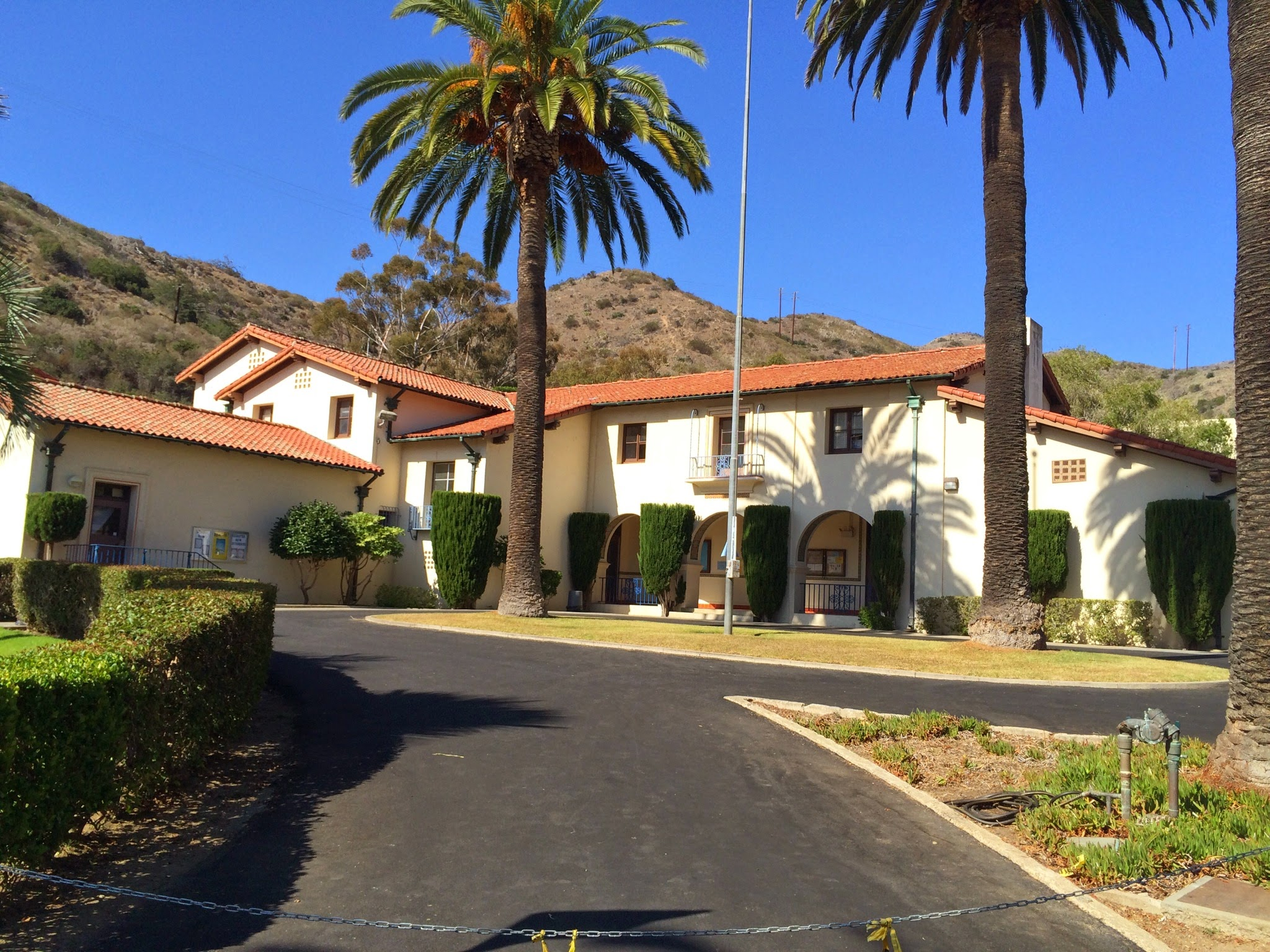
- Avalon high school building, 2014

Location
- 200 Falls Canyon Rd; Avalon, California 90704; United States; 33.34°N 118.33°W

Information
- Type: Public school
- Established: 1924
- School district: Long Beach Unified School District
- Principal: Emma Peguero
- Staff: 29.91 (FTE)
- Faculty: 315 Worldwide
- Grades: K-12
- Enrollment: 451 (2022-2023)
- Student to teacher ratio: 15.08
- Colors: Blue; Gold
- Team name: Lancers
- Website: avalon.lbschools.net

Ethnic composition as of 2020–21
Race and ethnicity	Total
Hispanic or Latino	79.2%
Non-Hispanic White/Anglo	19.1%
Other	1.5%
Pacific Islander	0.2%

Avalon School is a K-12 school in Avalon, California on Santa Catalina Island, 26 miles off the coast of California. The school is a part of the Long Beach Unified School District.

A remote one-room school house, Two Harbors Elementary located 18 miles (29 km) (an hour's bus ride) away at Two Harbors, closed in 2014 due to low enrollment, and its students were moved to Avalon School.
