= Two Harbors, California =

Unincorporated community in Los Angeles County, California, United States

- Unincorporated community
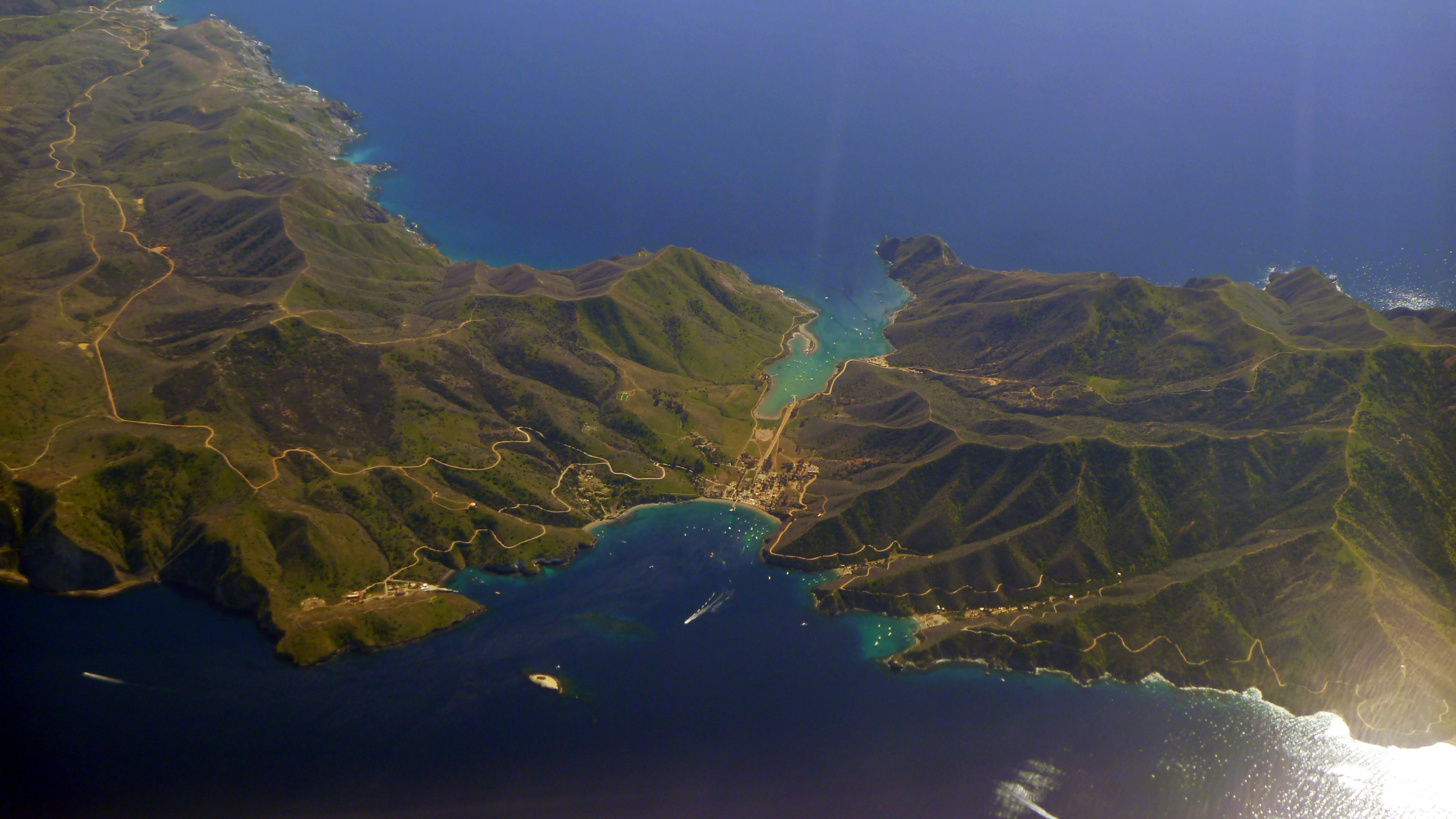
- View of Two Harbors from the north at 16,000 feet in 2015.
- Nickname: The Isthmus
- Location of Two Harbors in Los Angeles County, California.

- Location of Two Harbors Two Harbors (California) Two Harbors (the United States)
- Coordinates: 33°26′24″N 118°29′54″W
- Country: United States
- State: California
- County: Los Angeles

Population (2000)
  - Total: 298
- Time zone: UTC-8 (Pacific)
  - Summer (DST): UTC-7 (Pacific Daylight Time)
- Zip code: 90704
- Area code: 310

Two Harbors, traditionally and colloquially known as "The Isthmus", is a small unincorporated community island village on the island of Santa Catalina Island, California, United States, with a population of 298 (2000 Census). It is the second center of population on the island, besides the city of Avalon. It is primarily a resort village and resupply stop for camps and outdoor adventurers. Most residents work in tourism-related jobs or upkeep of island infrastructure. It has only one restaurant, one hotel and one general store, but also houses a large campsite and numerous offshore mooring balls for boaters visiting the area. It serves as a jumping-off point for visitors to Catalina, who come for hiking, mountain biking, horseback riding, fishing, snorkeling and scuba diving, kayaking, and conservation activities.

== Geography ==
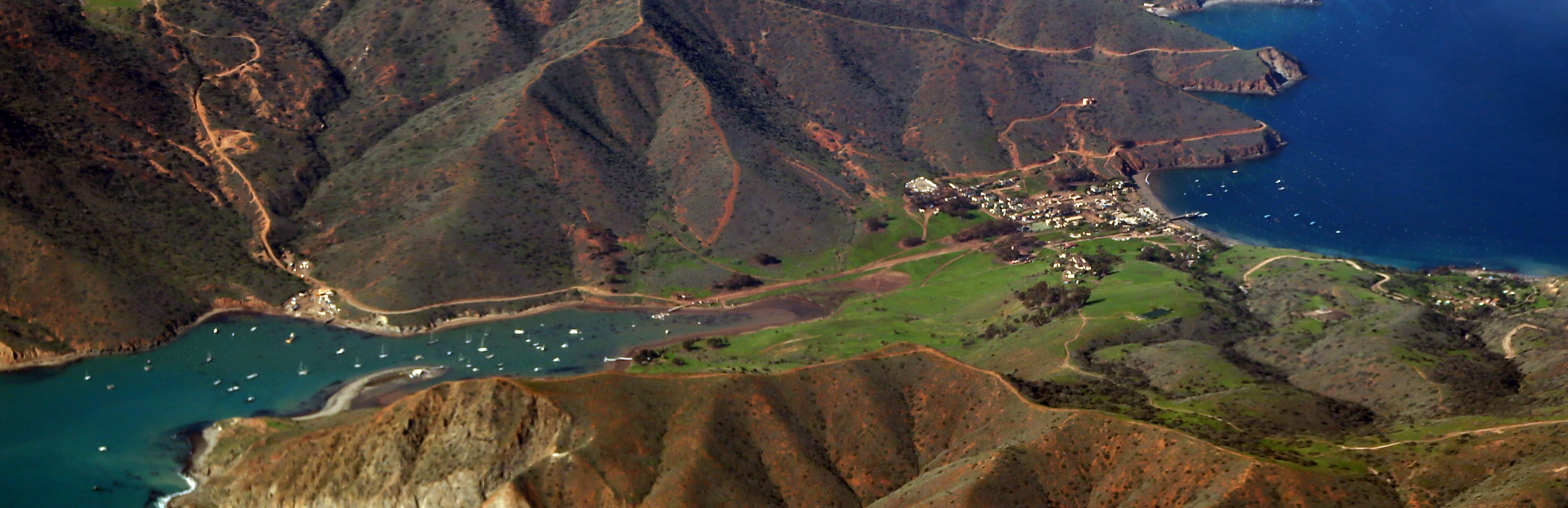
Two Harbors Isthmus, 2017. On the right or northeast is Isthmus Cove (or Banning Harbor), and on the left or southwest is Catalina (or Cat) Harbor.

Two Harbors is a small island village located approximately 23 miles (37 km) from San Pedro Harbor on Santa Catalina Island. On the island's narrow isthmus, it is located about 18 miles (29 km) from the only city on the island, Avalon. It is named for the two harbors separated by the 0.48-mile (770 m) section of land between the leeward (northern) Isthmus Cove (aka Banning Harbor) and Catalina (or Cat) Harbor on the windward (southern) side, which together almost cut off the northwestern sixth 12.2 sq mi (31.7 km^{2}) from the main part of the island. White Rock Island, commonly known as Bird Rock, is a small, privately owned island only 67,940 ft^{2} (6,312 m^{2}) in size. It is approximately 0.87 mi (1.4 km) northeast of Two Harbors, offshore from Isthmus Cove, and 1,540 ft (470 m) northwest of the closest coastal point. Further out to sea outside Isthmus Cove stands Ship Rock, a popular spot for scuba divers and fishermen.

Geographically, the main body of Santa Catalina Island and the smaller West End are distinct, only connected by the narrow low-lying land of the Isthmus. The deep bite of Cat Harbor and the broader sweep of Isthmus Cove separate most of the mountainous bodies of the two parts of Catalina Island.

Numerous camps operate in coves around Catalina Island, including Camp Emerald Bay, Camp Cherry Valley, and Catalina Island Camps at Howland's Landing. In addition, a number of yacht clubs operate landings and campsites in the vicinity, including Isthmus Yacht Club, Del Rey Yacht Club, and Fourth of July Yacht Club.

== History ==
The area where Two Harbors is located was originally referred to simply as the Isthmus of Catalina Island. By the 1860s, mining operations for silver, lead and zinc took place in the area. In 1864, during the Civil War, the Union Army sent 83 soldiers to the island to establish Camp Santa Catalina Island, both to protect the area from Confederate privateers and survey the isthmus and adjacent Catalina Harbor for the Bureau of Indian Affairs as a location for a future Indian reservation for "militant" tribes captured in the Bald Hills War. However, the reservation idea was abandoned and so was the camp. The Isthmus served as a primary staging area for cattle ranching on Catalina Island, primarily overseen by the Banning family. Banning House, now a guest house hotel, still stands on a shoulder overlooking the Isthmus. Barracks built earlier by the Army were later used to house visiting film crews in the 1920s and 1930s, a contingent of the U.S. Coast Guard during World War II, and in 1951 became the home of the Isthmus Yacht Club.

The Ning Po, a Chinese merchant ship built in 1753 and involved in over a century of war, rebellion, and piracy, eventually found its way to Catalina and was converted into a tourist attraction in 1913. The Ning Po burned off the western shore of the isthmus in 1938. The fire which destroyed her also claimed several wooden sailing vessels that had been used in filming motion-picture "spectaculars", including the famous old down-Easter Llewellyn J. Morse which stood in for the USS Constitution — with accurate re-rigging — in the silent film Old Ironsides.

Today, the Catalina Island Company controls most of the Isthmus and operates the general store, Harbor Reef Restaurant, Harbor Sands beach club, Banning House Lodge hotel, and other facilities.

== Accommodations ==
Most visitors to Two Harbors stay at Two Harbors Campground, which has numerous developed sites with nearby shower and laundry facilities, picnic tables, water, and restrooms. Many other visitors stay on boats moored in Isthmus Cove and Cat Harbor, as well as nearby coves including Fourth of July Cove and Cherry Cove. The only hotel in Two Harbors is the boutique Banning House Lodge, with guest rooms in and around the historic Banning House, as well as two private houses for rent.

Most permanent residents of Two Harbors live in worker housing provided by the Catalina Island Company. L.A. County Fire Department Station 155 and the L.A. County Sheriffs have housing for firefighters and law enforcement stationed on rotation at the Two Harbors.

== Education ==
=== Primary and secondary schools ===
Two Harbors is part of the Long Beach Unified School District. Two Harbors Elementary School, a one-room school nicknamed "The Little Red School House", opened in 1987 for elementary grades until grade 6, while Avalon School took grades 7-12. Two Harbors School opened so students would have far less of a commute time. The highest number of students the school ever had was almost 24. It closed in 2014 due to sharply declining enrollment. Two students would have attended for the 2014-2015 school year. All school age children now attend Avalon School.

=== Colleges and universities ===
The USC Wrigley Institute for Environmental Studies is an environmental research and education facility run by the University of Southern California in Two Harbors. The campus consists of a 30,000 square-foot (2,800 square-meter) laboratory building, a dormitory housing, a cafeteria, a hyperbaric chamber, and a large waterfront staging area complete with dock, pier, helipad, and diving lockers. The facility was made possible by a donation from the Wrigley family and was named for Philip K. Wrigley.

== Transportation ==
Two Harbors is served by the Catalina Express with regular daily service to San Pedro. A helicopter can also be chartered to the village. The Catalina Airport-In-The-Sky is 10 miles (16 km) away to the east. Alternatively, various charter boats offer private service to the island.

Most people generally walk or bike around and between Two Harbors and its neighboring campgrounds, Little Harbor and Parsons Landing. Currently there is no shuttle transportation available for guests between these sites.

The Cyclone ferry, run by the Catalina Island Company, is available seasonally for transportation between Avalon and Two Harbors. Taxi service is also available.

== Conservation ==
The Catalina Island Conservancy, which controls and protects over 80% of Catalina Island's landmass, does not have a permanent presence at the Isthmus. Their operations are based out of Avalon, but they have a cooperative agreement with the Catalina Island Company to provide recreation services at Two Harbors Visitors Services. This includes providing Conservancy maps of the island, as well as distributing permit tags for mountain biking in the interior of the island.

Trapping and population monitoring of the threatened Santa Catalina Island Fox often occurs around the Isthmus and the West End of the island. In winter, the island's population of American Bison often congregates in the vicinity of the Isthmus, where the Conservancy can monitor the size and health of the herd.

== Gallery ==
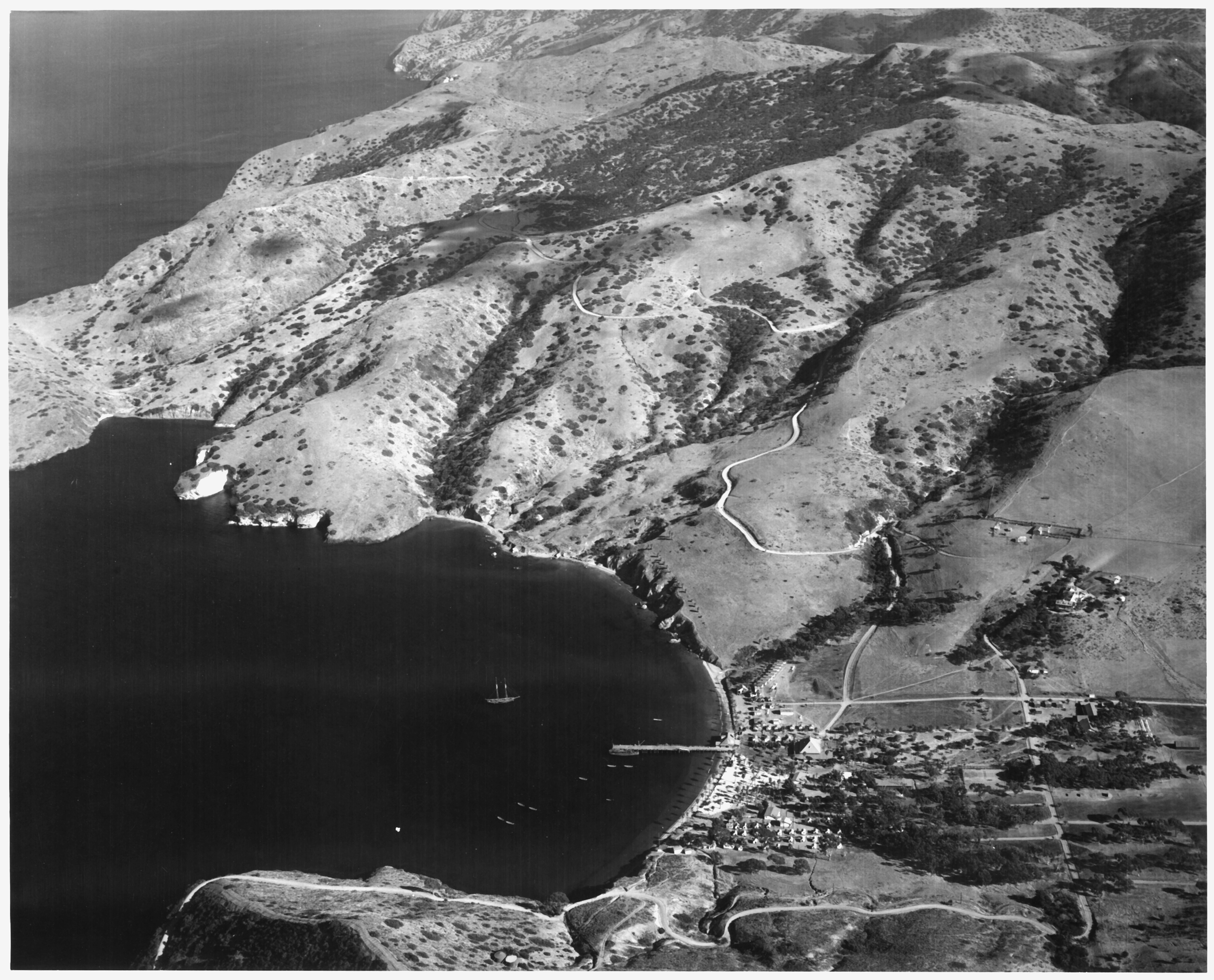
Aerial view of Naval-Coast Guard base at the Isthmus, probably taken in WW2 era. This is the future site of Two Harbors village.

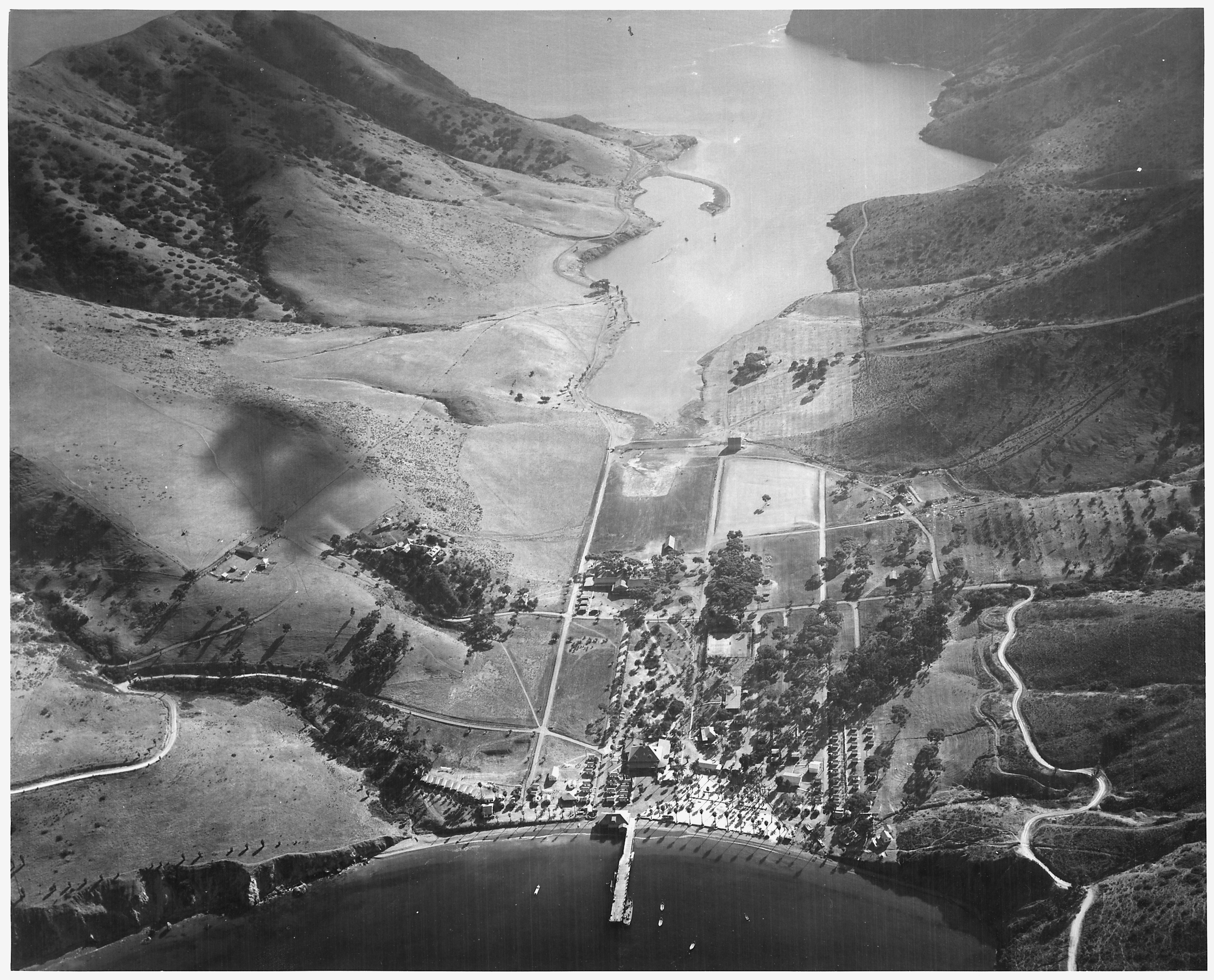
Naval-Coast Guard base prominent in the foreground, circa 1917-1947

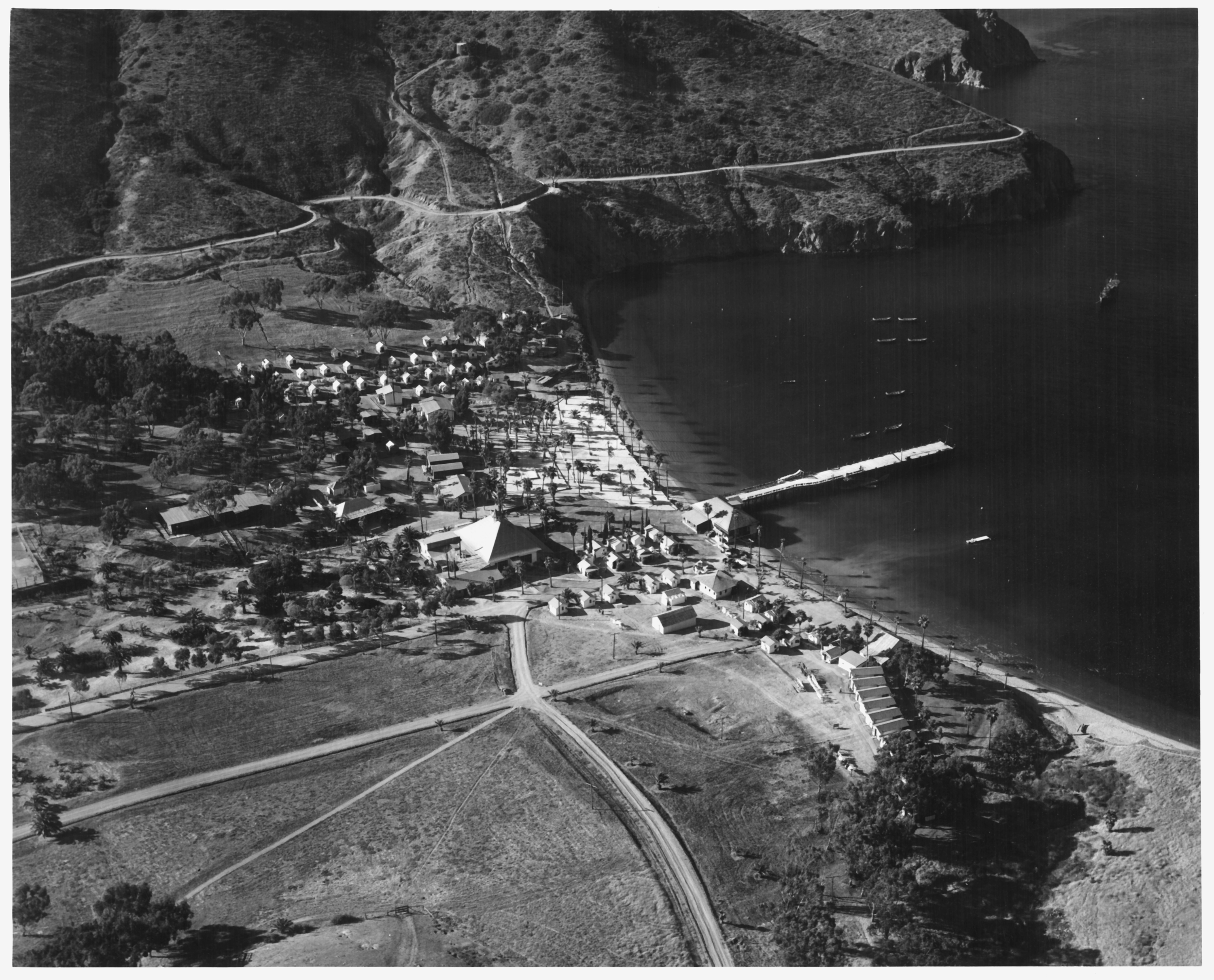

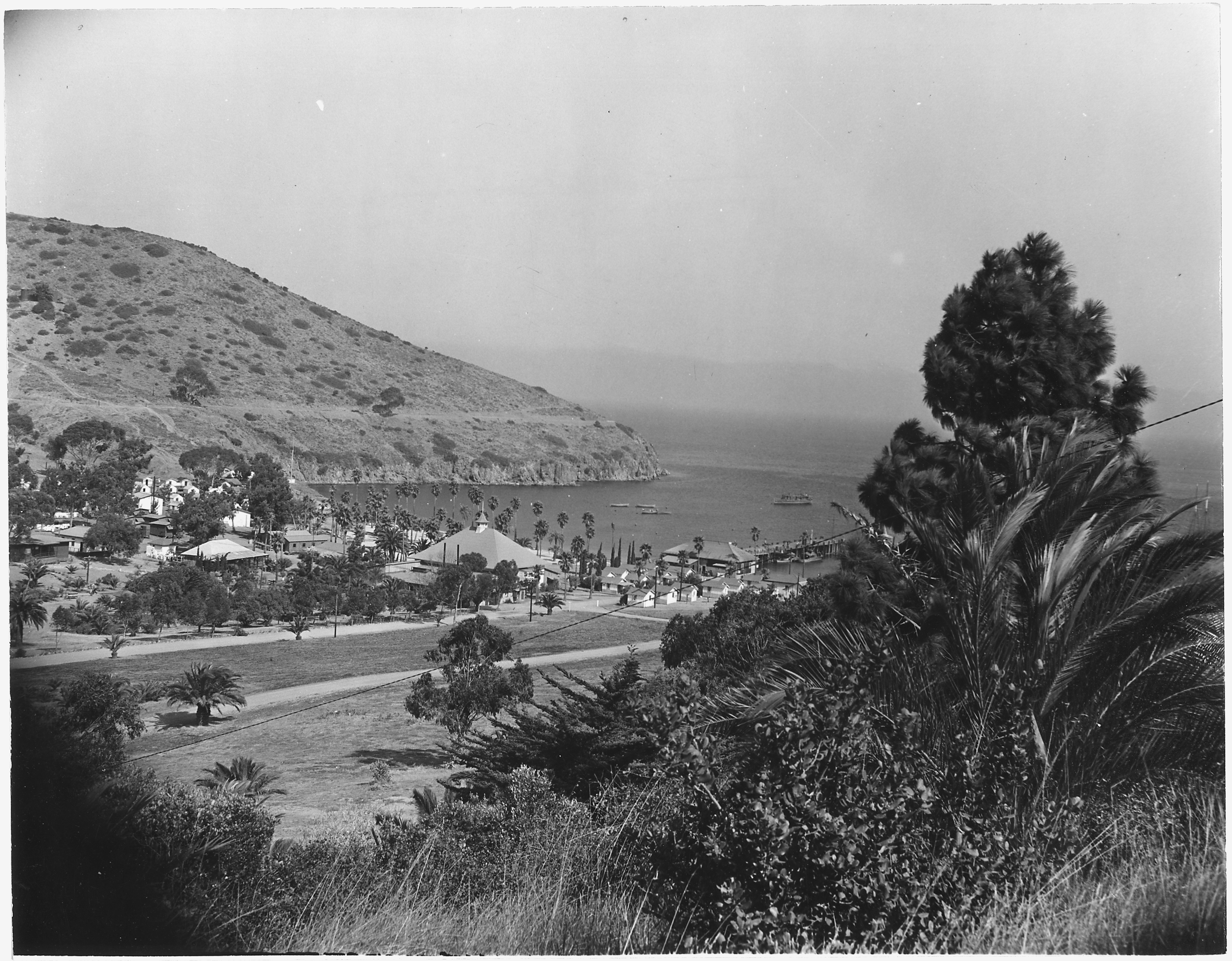

== See also ==
- Camp Cherry Valley
- Camp Emerald Bay
- LA County Library, Catalina Island Local History page
