= Avalon, California =

City in California, United States

- City
- Avalon Harbor from the air; April 2026.

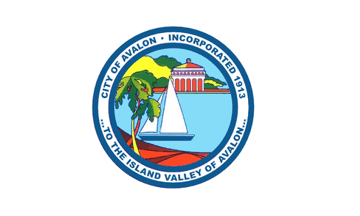
- Flag Seal
- Motto: To the Island Valley of Avalon
- Interactive map of Avalon, California
- Location within the Los Angeles metropolitan area Location within California Location within the United States
- Coordinates: 33°20′27″N 118°19′40″W
- Country: United States
- State: California
- County: Los Angeles
- Incorporated (city): June 26, 1913
- Named for: Avalon island, Idylls of the King

Government
  - Type: Council–manager
  - Mayor: Ann Marshall
  - Mayor Pro Tem: Michael Ponce
  - City Council: Yesenia De La Rosa; Lisa Lavelle; Donna Lopez
  - City Manager: David Maistros

Area
  - Total: 7.66 sq mi (19.83 km^{2})
  - Land: 2.88 sq mi (7.47 km^{2})
  - Water: 4.77 sq mi (12.35 km^{2}) 0.07%
- Elevation: 30 ft (9 m)

Population (2020)
  - Total: 3,460
  - Density: 1,199.0/sq mi (462.94/km^{2})
- Time zone: UTC-08:00 (PST)
  - Summer (DST): UTC-07:00 (PDT)
- ZIP Code: 90704
- Area code: 310/424
- FIPS code: 06-03274
- GNIS feature ID: 1660283
- Website: cityofavalon.gov

Avalon is the only incorporated city on Santa Catalina Island, in the California Channel Islands, and the southernmost city in Los Angeles County, California, United States. The city is a resort community with the waterfront dominated by tourism-oriented businesses. The older parts of the city on the valley floor consist primarily of small houses and two and three-story buildings in various traditional architectural styles.

In 1919, William Wrigley Jr. gained control of Avalon and oversaw much of its development, including the construction of the landmark Catalina Casino. From the late 19th century to the early 20th century, several different developers tried to develop Avalon into a resort destination community, but most before Wrigley went bankrupt.

The population was 3,460 at the 2020 census. Avalon attracts approximately one million visitors a year and is frequently visited by cruise ships. Before European colonization, the island was inhabited by the Tongva people.

== History ==
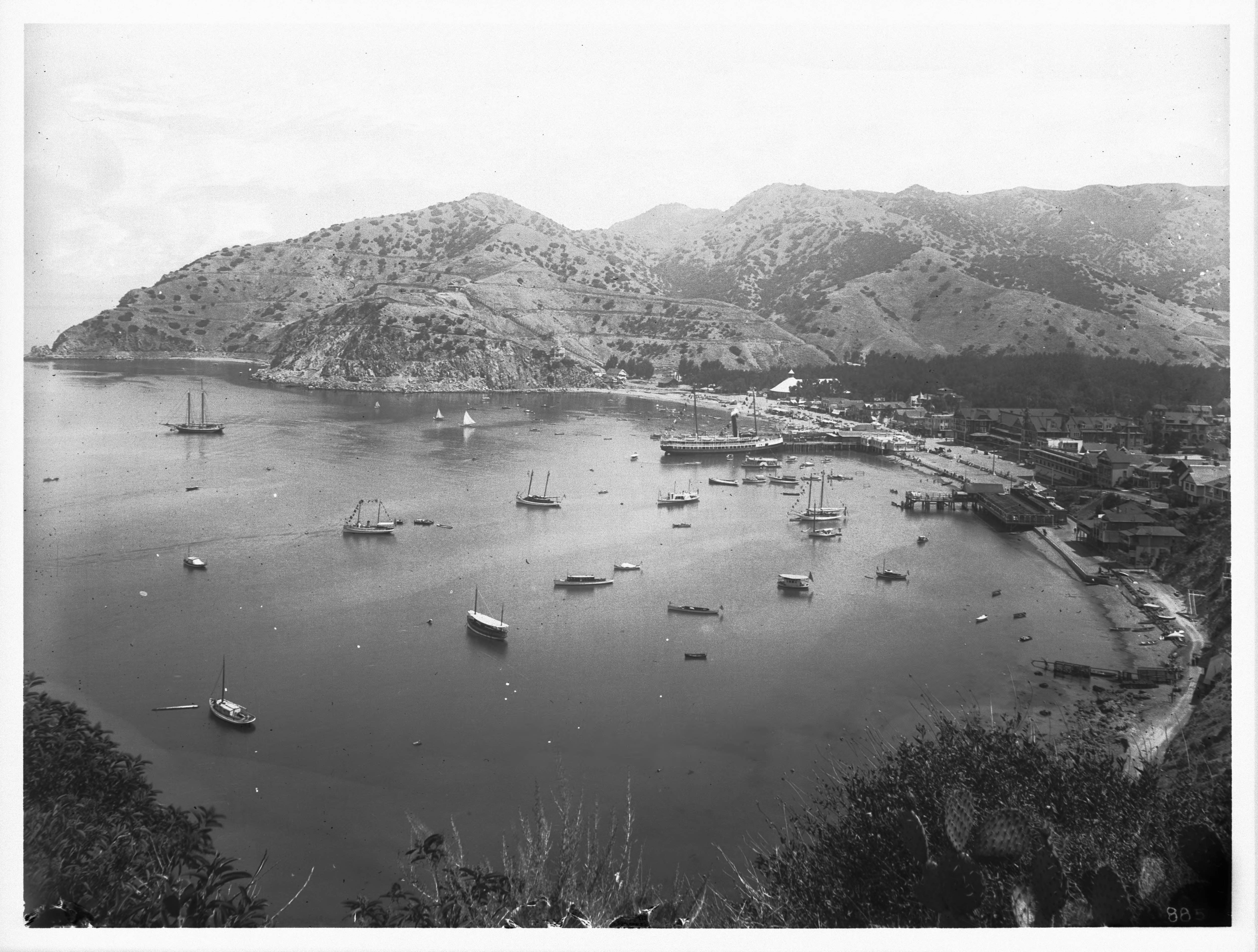
Avalon Bay from the north, ca.1900

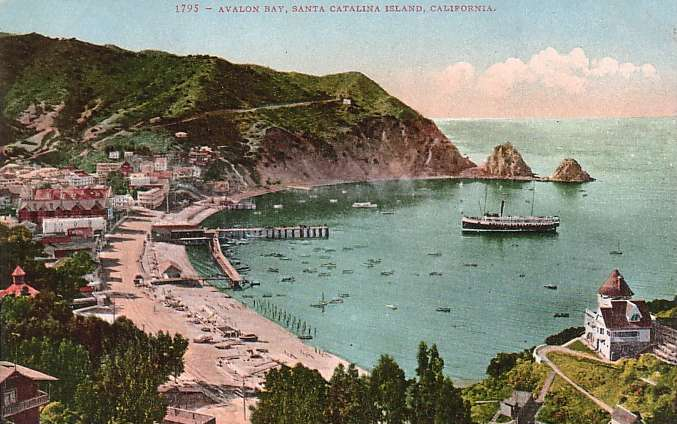
Avalon Bay around 1910 from the south, before the construction of the Catalina Casino

Prior to the modern era, Avalon Bay was inhabited by people of the Gabrielino/Tongva tribe. The island was a major source of soapstone to the Tongva, who used the material to make stone vessels for cooking. The Tongva called the island Pimu or Pimugna and referred to themselves as the Pimugnans. However, by the 1830s, the entire island's native population had either died off, or had undergone forcible relocation to the mainland to work in the missions or as ranch hands for the many private land owners.

In the 1860s, German immigrant Augustus William Timms ran a sheep herding business on Catalina Island. One of his vessels, the Rosita, would also ferry pleasure seekers across the channel to Avalon Bay for bathing and fishing. The settlement in Avalon was then referred to as Timms's Landing in his honor. By the summer of 1883, there were thirty tents and three wooden buildings at Timms's Landing.

The first owner to try to develop Avalon Bay into a resort destination was George Shatto, a real estate speculator from Grand Rapids, Michigan. Shatto purchased the island for $200,000 from the estate of James Lick at the height of a real estate boom in Southern California in 1887. Shatto created the settlement that would become Avalon, and can be credited with building the city's first hotel, the original Hotel Metropole, and pier. Though early maps labeled the city Shatto, Shatto's sister-in-law Etta Whitney came up with the permanent name of Avalon in reference from a poem by Lord Tennyson called "Idylls of the King" about the legend of King Arthur (which features an island of the same name). Shatto laid out Avalon's streets, and introduced it as a vacation destination to the general public. Despite Shatto's efforts, in a few years he had to default on his loan and the island went back to the Lick estate.

The sons of Phineas Banning bought the island in 1891 from the Lick estate and established the Santa Catalina Island Company to develop it as a resort. The Banning brothers fulfilled Shatto's dream of making Avalon a resort community. They built a dance pavilion in the center of the city, made additions to the Hotel Metropole and steamer-wharf, built an aquarium, and created the Pilgrim Club (a gambling club for men only). Just as the Bannings were anticipating the construction of a new, Hotel Saint Catherine, their efforts were set back on November 29, 1915, when a fire burned half of Avalon's buildings, including six hotels and several clubs. In 1919, due to debt related to the 1915 fire and a general decline in tourism during World War I, the Bannings were forced to sell the island in shares.

In February 1919, chewing gum magnate William Wrigley Jr. bought a controlling interest in Santa Catalina Island and its associated properties from the Banning Brothers. Wrigley devoted himself to preserving and promoting it, investing millions in needed infrastructure and attractions, including the construction of the new Catalina Casino, completed May 29, 1929. In order to encourage growth, Wrigley purchased additional steamships to service Avalon, including the SS Virginia (renamed the SS Avalon) and the SS Catalina which was launched on the morning of May 3, 1924. Wrigley also brought attention to the city of Avalon by having his Chicago Cubs use the island for the team's spring training from 1921 to 1951, absent the war years of 1942–45. The ball field was at the southwest border of Avalon, between Tremont Street and the golf course.

Following the death of William Wrigley Jr. in 1932, his son Philip K. Wrigley took over the Santa Catalina Island Company. Philip continued his father's work in the improvement of the infrastructure of the City of Avalon. During World War II, the island was closed to tourists and used for military training facilities, including a U.S. Maritime Service training facility in Avalon. Catalina's steamships were expropriated for use as troop transports, and the U.S. Maritime Service set up a training facility in Avalon. The Maritime Service announced on September 19, 1945, that the facility would soon be abandoned and all apprentice seaman on the west coast trained aboard three ocean-going vessels at Long Beach.

In 1975, Philip Wrigley deeded the Wrigley shares in the Santa Catalina Island Company to the Catalina Island Conservancy that he had helped create. The Conservancy now stewards 88 percent of the island, primarily outside of the City of Avalon. The Santa Catalina Island Company maintains control of much of its resort properties and operations within the City of Avalon. It still owns and operates many of the main tourist attractions in Avalon, including the Catalina Visitors Country Club, Catalina Island Golf Course, Descanso Beach Club and the Casino Ballroom.

In May 2007, the Island Fire burned 4,750 acres (19.2 km^{2}) of land just outside Avalon's city limits. Over 200 firefighting recruits were brought over by U.S. Marine hovercraft and helicopter to protect the city. Ultimately, only one residence and six commercial structures were destroyed.

In February 2011, water regulators cited the city for letting tens of thousands of gallons of sewage reach the ocean in six spills since 2005. A report in June 2011 by the Natural Resources Defense Council listed Avalon as having one of the 10 most chronically polluted beaches in the United States. The pollution was caused by the city's sewer system, made of century-old clay and metal pipes. By 2011, the city had spent $3.5 million testing and rehabilitating sewer lines, but the water was no cleaner. In February 2012, a cease and desist order was issued against the city for illegally discharging polluted water into the bay. After the cease and desist order, the city invested an additional $5.7 million on sewer main improvements and inspection and tracking systems. As a result of these efforts, the 2014 report showed that water quality had improved, and Avalon Beach was removed from the list of the most polluted beaches.

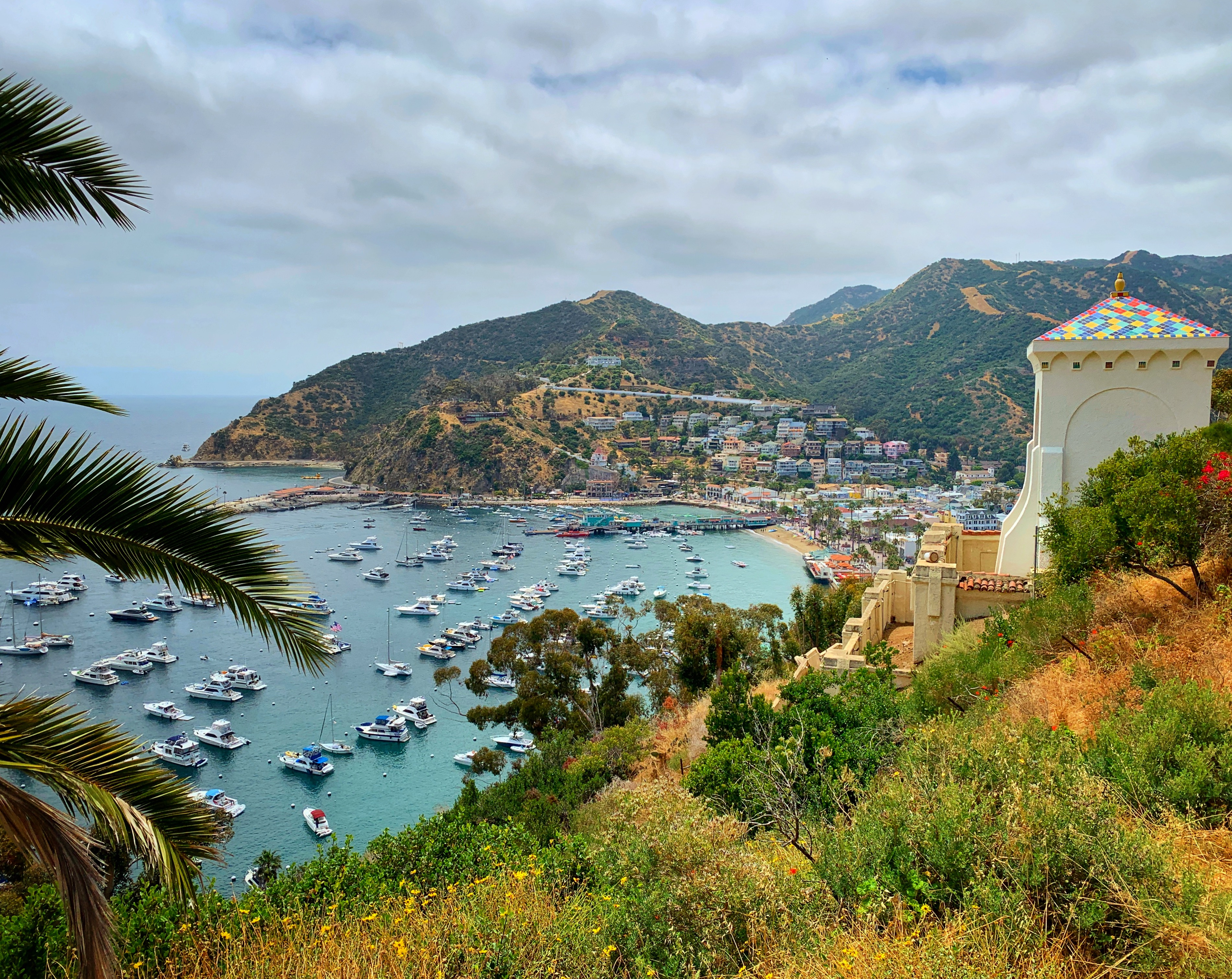
Avalon Harbor from behind the Chimes Tower, est. 1925

In the 2010s, the Santa Catalina Island Company began a series of projects to upgrade the tourist amenities in Avalon, including the installation of a zip line at Descanso Beach. By 2014, the Santa Catalina Island Company was working on a number of redevelopment and remodeling projects, including a spa, aquatic facility, community center, new hotel, and 120 new homes. The largest project was a new $6-million museum building on Metropole Street to replace the old location in the Casino building. Some community members, including a member of the City Council, expressed concerns about the pace of the changes to the town.

== Geography ==
Avalon is located on Santa Catalina Island, approximately 22 miles (35 km) south-by-southwest of the Los Angeles Harbor breakwater. It is the only incorporated city to be located on one of the eight Channel Islands of California. Due to its location on Catalina Island, it is the southernmost city in Los Angeles County. According to the United States Census Bureau, the city has a total area of 2.9 sq mi (8 km^{2}) on land and 58,975 sq ft (5,479 m^{2}) on water.

=== Cityscape ===
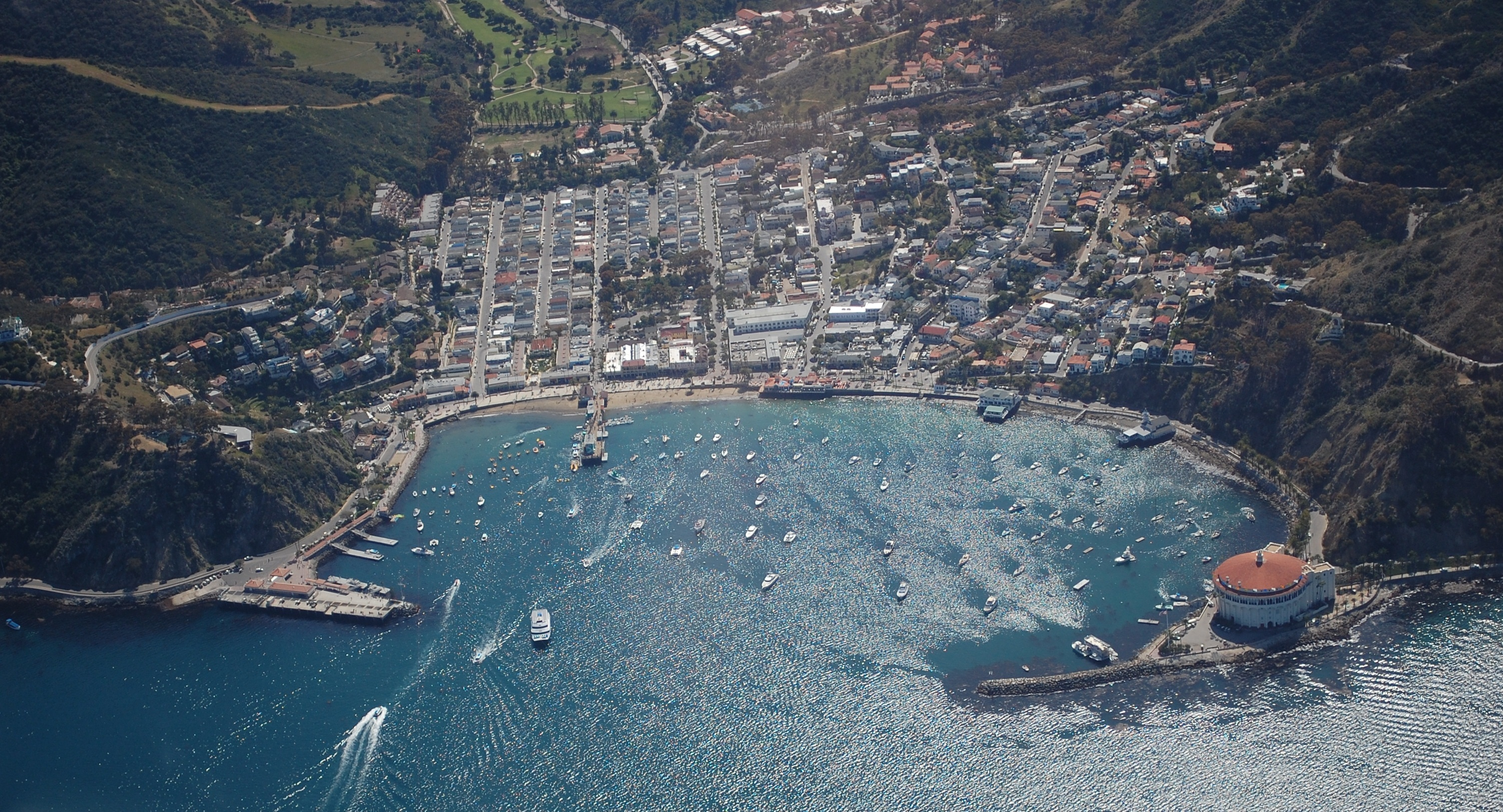
Avalon town and harbor

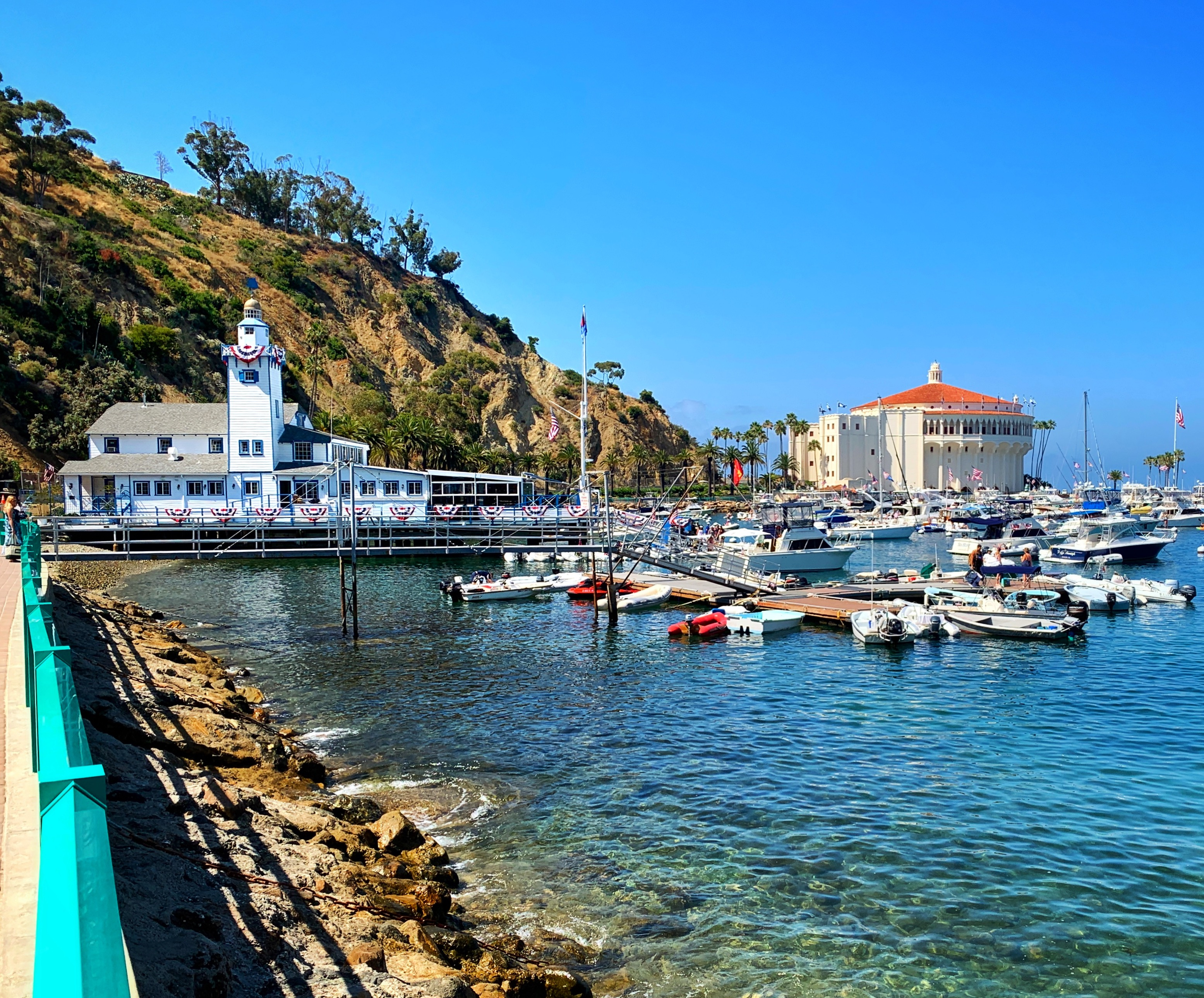
Catalina Island Yacht Club in Avalon

The City of Avalon is oriented around Avalon Bay, with the harbor and beaches forming the center of the town's activity. The Cabrillo Mole, located at the south end of the harbor, acts both as a breakwater and the main docks for the cross-channel passenger boats. Many of the commercial businesses dedicated to serving visitors are located along the Crescent Street pedestrian mall, which runs just behind the three main beaches of Avalon Bay. The pedestrian walkway is adorned throughout with decorative pavers, fountains, palm trees, and a decorative serpentine seawall. Many of these features were introduced to Avalon during an extensive re-design undertaken by Philip K. Wrigley in 1934. Extending out into the center of the harbor is the green Pleasure Pier. The north end of the harbor is dominated by the Catalina Casino. Built in a style described as a cross between Art Deco and Mediterranean Revival, the Casino serves as Avalon's most distinctive landmark.

Outside of the bay and just north of the Casino is Descanso Beach, a private beach, entertainment and meetings venue run by the Santa Catalina Island Company. At the farthest north end of town are the Hamilton Cove condominiums, a gated community consisting mostly of second homes. South of the bay is Lovers Cove dive park, a marine reserve frequented by both snorkelers and the classic glass-bottom boat tours. Further south still is Pebbly Beach, an industrial area home to the Pebbly Beach Seaplane Base & Heliport and Pebbly Beach Generating Station, where Avalon gets its power.

Most of the residential units in Avalon are tucked away off of the beachfront, either in the flat lands further back into the canyon or on the hills that constitute the sides of Avalon Valley. Many of the major municipal amenities are located even further into the canyon, including City Hall, the fire station, the Catalina Island Medical Center, and Avalon Schools. The William Wrigley Jr. Summer Cottage, also known as Mount Ada, is now a hotel. The Wrigley Memorial and Botanical Gardens are located at the farthest end of town away from the bay. The Memorial prominently features native Catalina Island building materials, including the famous pottery and tile that were made on the island from 1927 through 1937.

=== Climate ===
Avalon has a semi-arid climate (Koppen: BSk), with mild temperatures year-round. The National Weather Service maintained a cooperative station at the Avalon Pleasure Pier from 1909 through 1988. Average January temperatures are a maximum of 64.6 °F (18.1 °C) and a minimum of 49.3 °F (9.6 °C) and average August temperatures are a maximum of 75.4 °F (24.1 °C) and a minimum of 64.1 °F (17.8 °C). The highest recorded temperature was 105.1 °F (40.6 °C) on July 6, 2018, during a major Southern California heatwave, and the lowest recorded temperature was 29 °F (−2 °C) on January 2, 1973.

Annual average precipitation is 11.88 inches (30.2 cm) and there are 34 days with measurable precipitation. The wettest year was 1983 with 34.54 inches (87.7 cm) and the driest year was 1953 with 4.10 inches (10.4 cm). The most rainfall in one month was 11.68 inches (29.7 cm) in May 1921. The most rainfall in 24 hours was 6.75 inches (17.1 cm) on October 22, 1941. Weather records are still maintained at the Santa Catalina airport.

Climate data for Catalina Airport (KAVX), Elevation: 1,602 ft (488 m)
Month	Jan	Feb	Mar	Apr	May	Jun	Jul	Aug	Sep	Oct	Nov	Dec	Year
Record high °C (°F)	74 (23)	76 (24)	81 (27)	82 (28)	87 (31)	90 (32)	105 (41)	113 (45)	110 (43)	83 (28)	76 (24)	74 (23)	113 (45)
Mean daily maximum °C (°F)	58 (14)	58 (14)	60 (16)	63 (17)	67 (19)	72 (22)	78 (26)	79 (26)	77 (25)	71 (22)	63 (17)	58 (14)	67 (19)
Mean daily minimum °C (°F)	44 (7)	44 (7)	45 (7)	47 (8)	51 (11)	55 (13)	61 (16)	62 (17)	60 (16)	55 (13)	48 (9)	44 (7)	51 (11)
Record low °C (°F)	29 (−2)	32 (0)	26 (−3)	39 (4)	43 (6)	48 (9)	50 (10)	52 (11)	51 (11)	46 (8)	39 (4)	30 (−1)	26 (−3)
Source: Western Regional Climate Center & NOAA

== Demographics ==
Historical population
Census	Pop.	Note	%±
1920	586		—
1930	1,897		223.7%
1940	1,637		−13.7%
1950	1,506		−8.0%
1960	1,536		2.0%
1970	1,520		−1.0%
1980	2,022		33.0%
1990	2,918		44.3%
2000	3,127		7.2%
2010	3,728		19.2%
2020	3,460		−7.2%
U.S. Decennial Census; 1860–1870 1880-1890; 1900 1910 1920; 1930 1940 1950; 1960 1970 1980; 1990 2000 2010; 2020

=== Racial and ethnic composition ===
Avalon city, California – Racial and ethnic composition Note: the US Census treats Hispanic/Latino as an ethnic category. This table excludes Latinos from the racial categories and assigns them to a separate category. Hispanics/Latinos may be of any race.
Race / Ethnicity (NH = Non-Hispanic)	Pop 1990	Pop 2000	Pop 2010	Pop 2020	% 1990	% 2000	% 2010	% 2020
White alone (NH)	1,709	1,578	1,532	1,366	58.58%	50.46%	41.09%	39.48%
Black or African American alone (NH)	4	12	10	29	0.14%	0.38%	0.27%	0.84%
Native American or Alaska Native alone (NH)	11	18	6	4	0.38%	0.58%	0.16%	0.12%
Asian alone (NH)	24	19	44	29	0.82%	0.61%	1.18%	0.84%
Native Hawaiian or Pacific Islander alone (NH)	24	7	10	9	0.82%	0.22%	0.27%	0.26%
Other race alone (NH)	-	4	4	11	-	0.13%	0.11%	0.32%
Mixed race or Multiracial (NH)	x	52	43	109	x	1.66%	1.15%	3.15%
Hispanic or Latino (any race)	1,170	1,437	2,079	1,903	40.10%	45.95%	55.77%	55.00%
Total	2,918	3,127	3,728	3,460	100.00%	100.00%	100.00%	100.00%

=== 2020 census ===
As of the 2020 census, Avalon had a population of 3,460 and a population density of 1,198.9 inhabitants per square mile (462.9/km^{2}).

The census reported that 99.4% of the population lived in households, 0.1% lived in non-institutionalized group quarters, and 0.5% were institutionalized. Of residents, 97.2% lived in urban areas and 2.8% lived in rural areas.

There were 1,368 households, out of which 32.7% included children under the age of 18, 42.1% were married-couple households, 7.3% were cohabiting couple households, 27.8% had a female householder with no partner present, and 22.8% had a male householder with no partner present. 28.7% of households were one person, and 10.2% were one person aged 65 or older. The average household size was 2.51. There were 876 families (64.0% of all households).

The age distribution was 21.8% under the age of 18, 8.0% aged 18 to 24, 24.8% aged 25 to 44, 28.4% aged 45 to 64, and 16.8% who were 65 years of age or older. The median age was 40.6 years. For every 100 females, there were 92.5 males, and for every 100 females age 18 and over there were 96.4 males.

There were 2,195 housing units at an average density of 760.6 units per square mile (293.7 units/km^{2}), of which 1,368 (62.3%) were occupied and 827 (37.7%) were vacant. Of occupied units, 29.2% were owner-occupied and 70.8% were occupied by renters. The homeowner vacancy rate was 3.3%, and the rental vacancy rate was 9.5%.

=== Income and poverty ===
In 2023, the US Census Bureau estimated that the median household income was $91,713, and the per capita income was $37,155. About 8.1% of families and 8.0% of the population were below the poverty line.

=== 2010 census ===
The 2010 United States census reported that Avalon had a population of 3,728. The population density was 1,269.2 inhabitants per square mile (490.0/km^{2}). The racial makeup of Avalon was 2,313 (62.0%) White (41.1% Non-Hispanic White), 20 (0.5%) African American, 22 (0.6%) Native American, 49 (1.3%) Asian, 13 (0.3%) Pacific Islander, 1,137 (30.5%) from other races, and 174 (4.7%) from two or more races. Hispanic or Latino of any race were 2,079 persons (55.8%).

The Census reported that 3,721 people (99.8% of the population) lived in households, 0 (0%) lived in non-institutionalized group quarters, and 7 (0.2%) were institutionalized.

There were 1,473 households, out of which 488 (33.1%) had children under the age of 18 living in them, 641 (43.5%) were opposite-sex married couples living together, 160 (10.9%) had a female householder with no husband present, 90 (6.1%) had a male householder with no wife present. There were 110 (7.5%) unmarried opposite-sex partnerships, and 5 (0.3%) same-sex married couples or partnerships. 461 households (31.3%) were made up of individuals, and 125 (8.5%) had someone living alone who was 65 years of age or older. The average household size was 2.53. There were 891 families (60.5% of all households); the average family size was 3.25.

The population was spread out, with 960 people (25.8%) under the age of 18, 316 people (8.5%) aged 18 to 24, 953 people (25.6%) aged 25 to 44, 1,093 people (29.3%) aged 45 to 64, and 406 people (10.9%) who were 65 years of age or older. The median age was 37.7 years. For every 100 females, there were 102.8 males. For every 100 females age 18 and over, there were 98.6 males.

There were 2,266 housing units at an average density of 771.5 per square mile (297.9/km^{2}), of which 383 (26.0%) were owner-occupied, and 1,090 (74.0%) were occupied by renters. The homeowner vacancy rate was 4.7%; the rental vacancy rate was 10.7%. 801 people (21.5% of the population) lived in owner-occupied housing units and 2,920 people (78.3%) lived in rental housing units.

According to the 2010 United States census, Avalon had a median household income of $65,433, with 12.5% of the population living below the federal poverty line.

== Economy ==
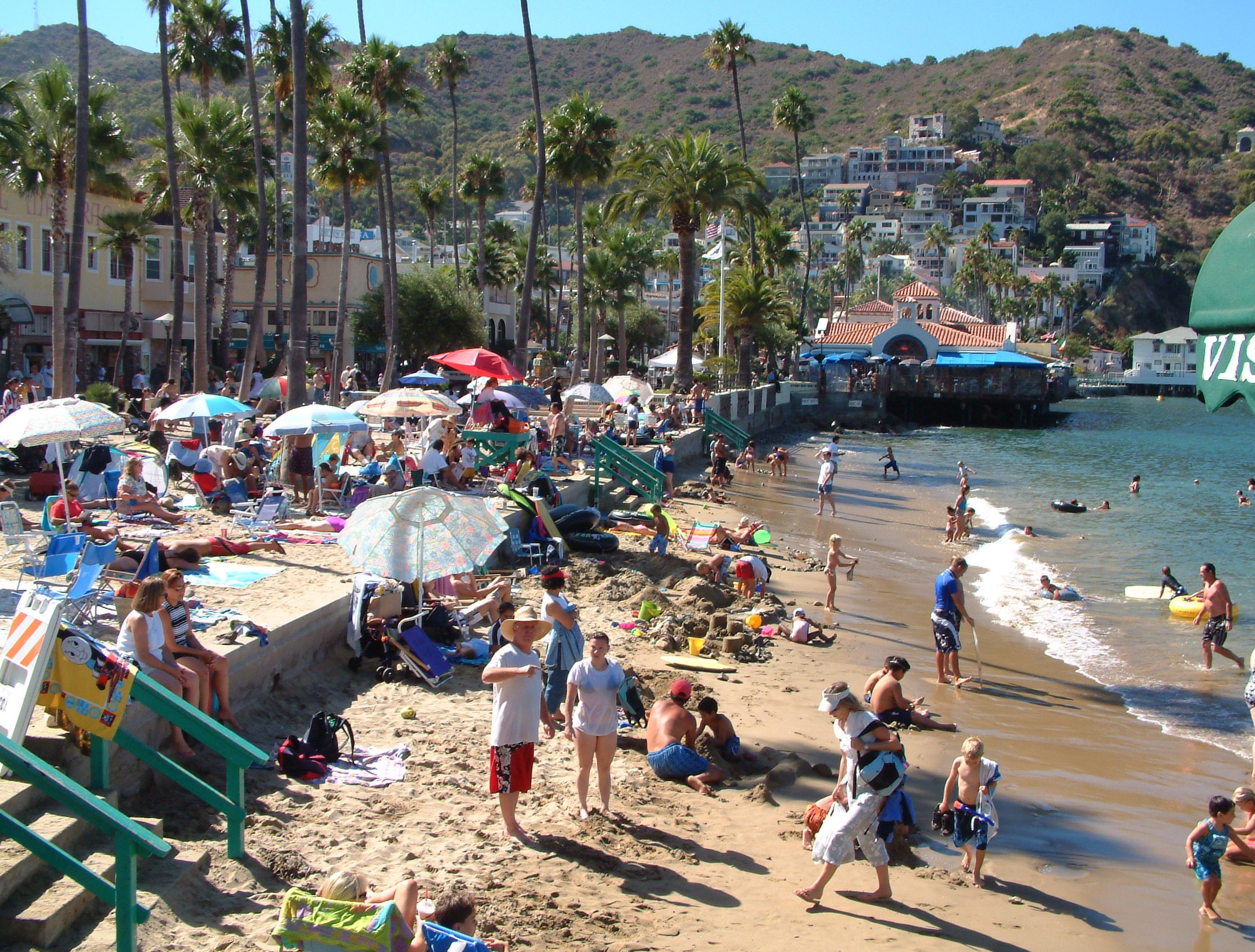
Beachgoers and tourists are major contributors to Avalon's economy

Avalon is a resort community and has a primarily tourist-based economy. As of 2016, 38.4% of the employed population worked in the arts, entertainment, recreation, accommodation and food services industries. An additional 13% worked in retail trade and 7% in real estate, rental, and leasing. Other major sources of employment in Avalon included education and healthcare (8%), construction (3%), transportation and warehousing (9%), and other services except public administration (8%) Overall, there were a total of 202 establishments with a combined annual payroll of $90 million as of 2012. The Love Catalina Island Tourism Authority operates as the official Destination Marketing Organization (DMO) for the island and hosts a Visitor Center open 364 days a year on the Green Pleasure Pier.

The city's poverty rate is 14.0% and the number of families in poverty stands at 11.9%. The unemployment rate stood at 3.7% as of October 2014, compared to 7.9% in Los Angeles County as a whole.

== Government ==
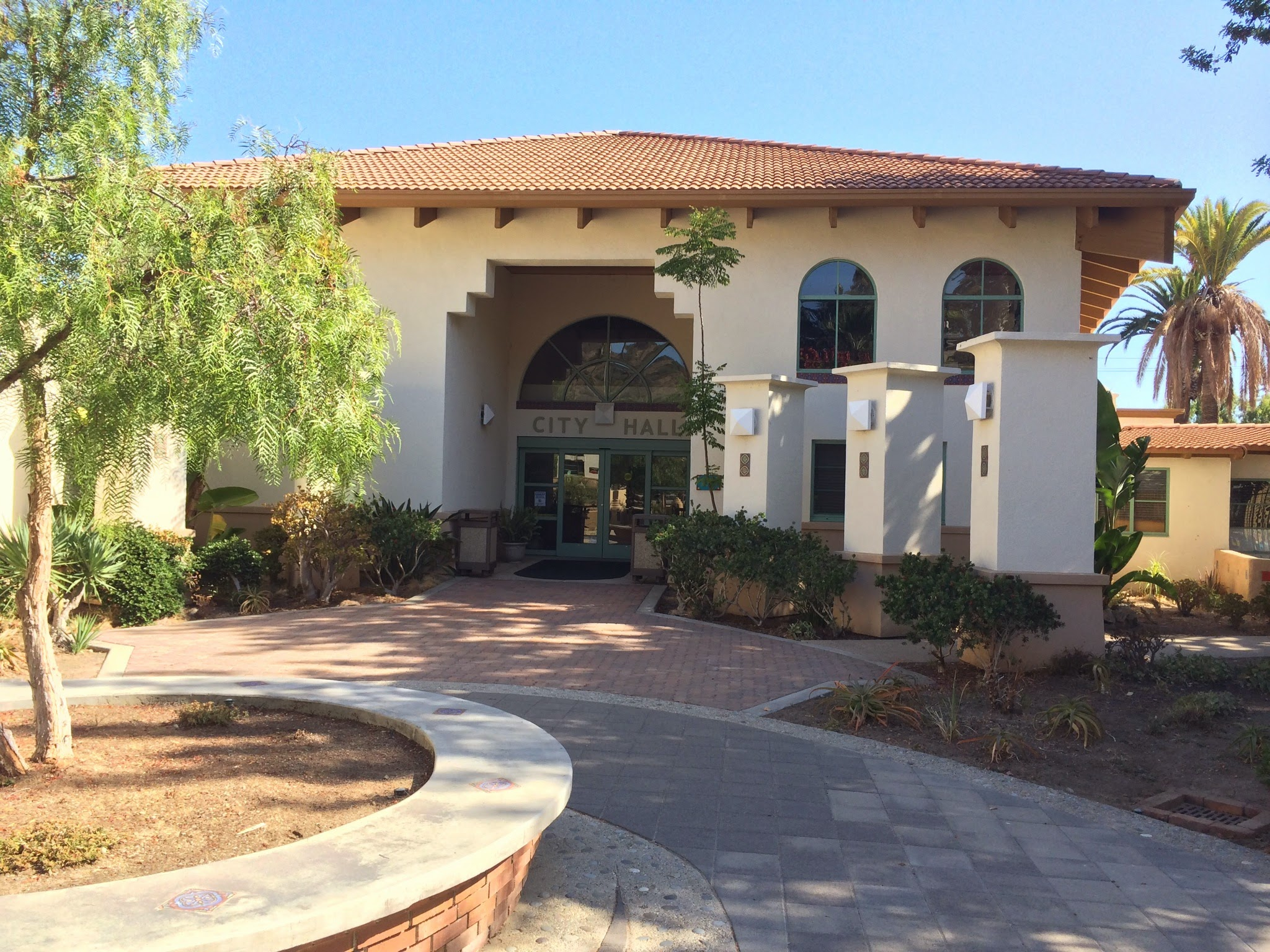
Avalon City Hall front entrance

The municipal government of the City of Avalon is of the council–manager type. The Mayor is elected to serve a two-year term while the City Councilors are elected to four-year terms. The City Manager is the executive officer of the city and is appointed directly by the City Council. The new City Hall was completed June 8, 2004. It contains local government offices as well as the council chambers.

In the California State Legislature, Avalon is located in the 33rd senatorial district, represented by Democrat Lena Gonzalez, and in the 69th Assembly district, represented by Democrat Josh Lowenthal. Federally, Avalon is in California's 42nd congressional district, represented by Democrat Robert Garcia.

The Los Angeles County Sheriff's Department (LASD) operates the Avalon Station in Avalon. Several deputies are stationed on the island full-time with additional units brought from the mainland on an as-needed and seasonal basis. The city has its own full-time and volunteer fire departments for incidents within the city limits, while the Los Angeles County Fire Department serves the rest of the island. The Los Angeles County Department of Health Services operates the Torrance Health Center in Harbor Gateway, Los Angeles, near Torrance and serving Avalon. The City of Avalon also provides additional services such as the Avalon Harbor Patrol.

The United States Postal Service Avalon Post Office (ZIP 90704) is located at 118 Metropole Street.

Avalon has voted for Democrats in the last four presidential elections, and has also displayed some independent leanings. In 2016, both Donald Trump and Hillary Clinton received a lower percentage of the vote than the previous nominees of their respective parties had received. In 1992, independent candidate Ross Perot carried the city with 323 votes to George H.W. Bush's 315.

== Education ==
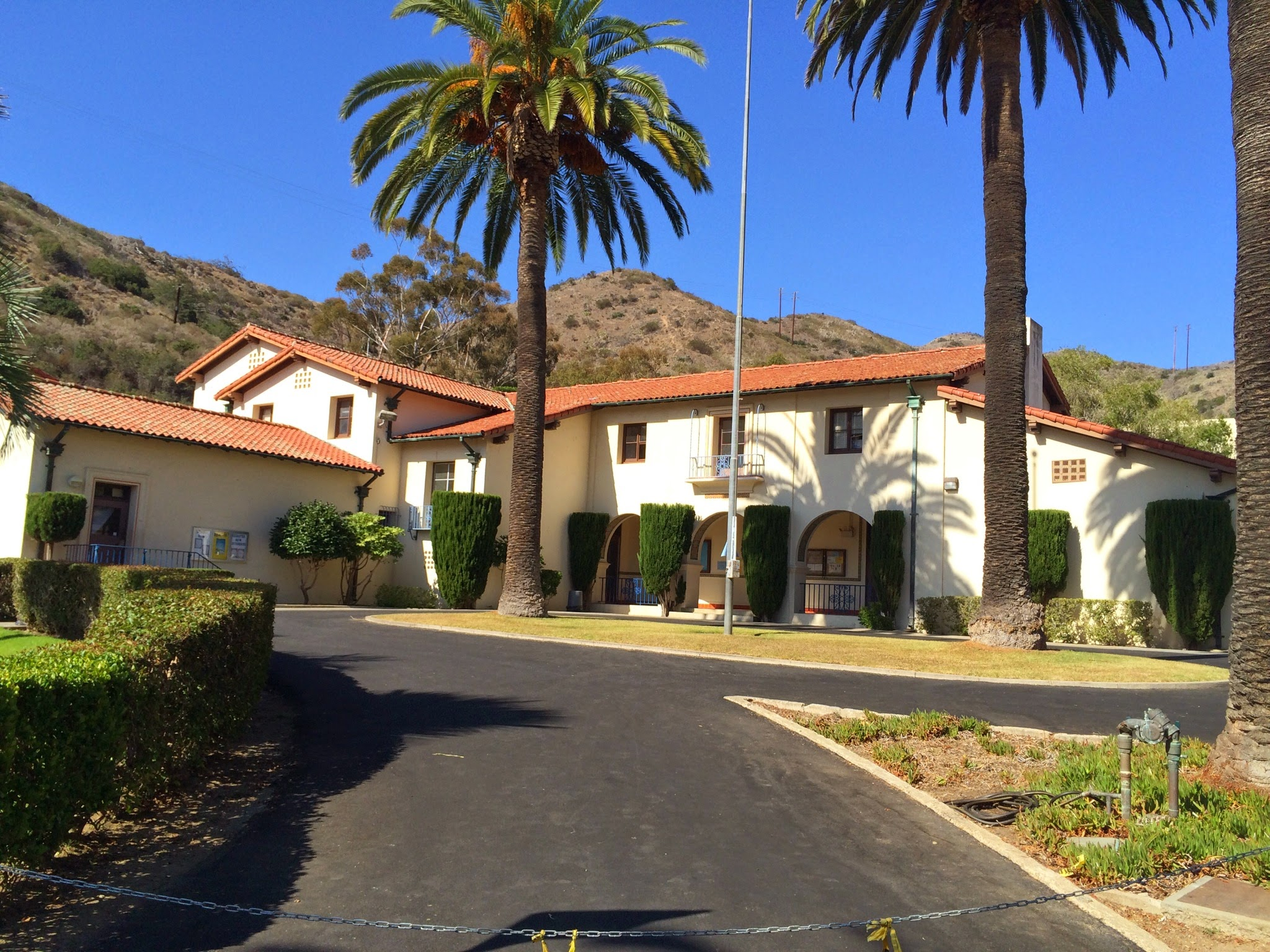
Avalon Schools high school building

There are two preschools within the City of Avalon, Catalina Kid Ventures and Pre-School Learning for Avalon Youth (P.L.A.Y.). Kid Ventures is located next to City Hall and is funded through the city support, tuition payments, and charitable donations. P.L.A.Y. is a cooperative preschool that is tucked further back into the canyon at 4 Bird Park Canyon Road. It is located at the site of the former Bird Park, which itself was built from materials left over from the demolition of the original Sugarloaf Casino.

For K-12 education, children attend Avalon School. Avalon Schools are part of the Long Beach Unified School District. It is divided into an elementary, middle, and high school, but a single principal administers all three levels of education. The campus is composed of three Mission Style buildings, a gymnasium, four secondary bungalows, and sixteen elementary bungalows. For high school sports, Avalon is a member of the CIF Southern Section. The school mascot is the Lancer. The teams are referred to either as the "Avalon Lancers" or "Lancers". Home games are played in Avalon, and visiting teams must travel by boat to the island in order to make the games. In turn, the Lancers travel to the mainland for away games.

Children in Avalon have one other option for elementary education. Children may also study at the private Avalon Christian School, located on 346 Catalina Avenue. Students then attend Avalon Schools for junior high and high school education. In 2014, LBUSD closed its long-time one-room school, Two Harbors Elementary School, at Two Harbors in unincorporated Los Angeles County, citing that just two students remained would have attended the following year.

== Infrastructure ==
=== Transportation ===
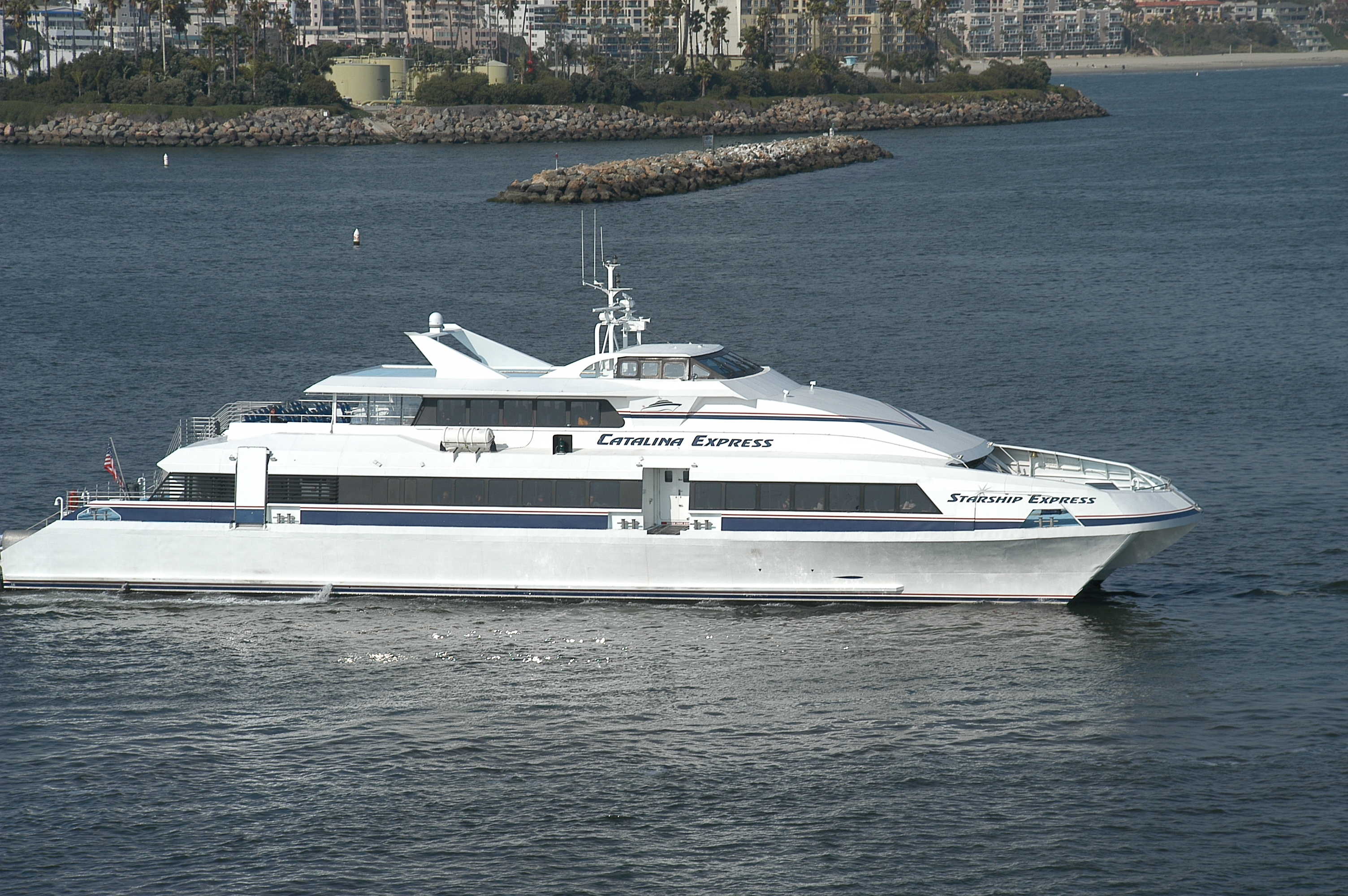
Catalina Express leaving Long Beach for Avalon

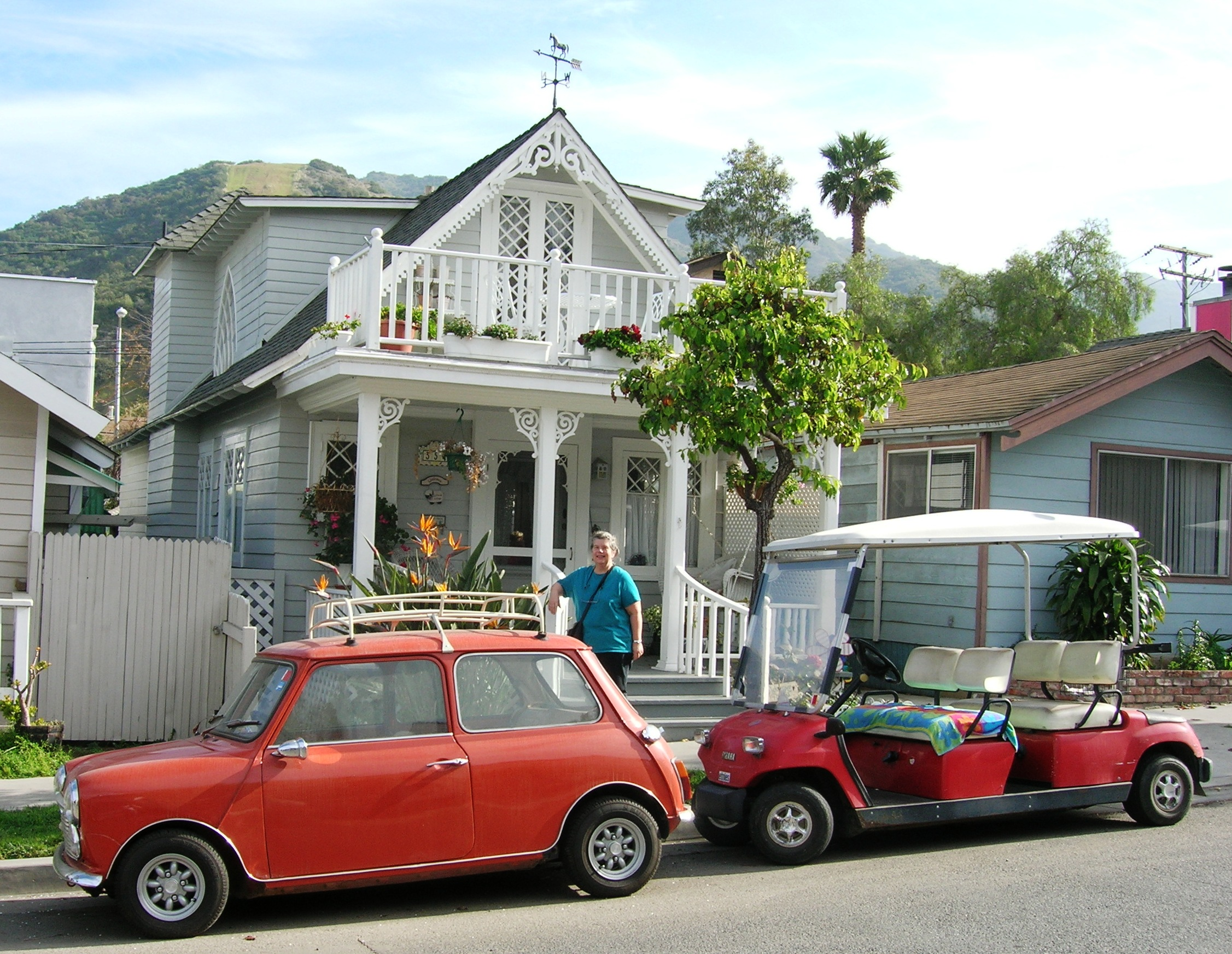
"Autoettes" in Avalon: a Mini and a golf cart

The city is served by several high-speed passenger boats with daily services such as the Catalina Express to San Pedro in Los Angeles; Long Beach; and Dana Point. Daily service is also provided by the Catalina Flyer to Newport Beach in Orange County. A ferry run by the Catalina Island Company is available seasonally for transportation between Avalon and Two Harbors. Private vessels that come to Avalon Harbor are assigned a mooring by the Avalon Harbor Patrol on a first-come, first-served basis. Boaters can get from their vessels to shore either by mooring their dinghies at one of the dinghy docks, or by catching a ride on a private shoreboat.

Several helicopter companies serve the city, with most landing at the Pebbly Beach Heliport, located south of Avalon Bay. Small planes can also land at the Catalina Airport, known as the "Airport in the Sky", located 7 miles (11 km) northwest of Avalon. Historically, during the early 1970s, scheduled passenger seaplane service was operated by Catalina Air Lines, a division of Golden West Airlines, between Avalon Harbor and both Long Beach Airport and the Orange County Airport (now John Wayne Airport). Golden West Airlines also operated de Havilland Canada DHC-6 Twin Otter STOL turboprops with scheduled passenger service at this same time between Airport in the Sky and both Los Angeles International Airport (LAX) and Long Beach Airport.

The main method of transportation within the city is by small gasoline or electric powered motorcars referred to locally as "autoettes". These include numerous golf carts and similarly sized vehicles. Vehicles under 55 inches (140 cm) wide, 120 inches (300 cm) long, and less than 1,800 pounds (820 kg) may qualify as an autoette. Any resident may acquire an autoette permit with the restriction of one permit per household. It is very difficult for a private citizen to get a permit to have a full-size vehicle in Avalon. The permit is issued to the individual as opposed to a specific vehicle, is surrendered when residency on the island ends, and is not transferable except through petition before the city council. Only one new vehicle permit is issued for every two permits that become ineligible to be renewed or are voluntarily surrendered. For purposes of vehicle registration, Catalina Island is divided into two classifications: within Avalon and "Interior" (areas outside the city limits). The city has its own strict permit program with which local vehicle owners must comply, in addition to the usual requirements imposed by the California Department of Motor Vehicles. Because of these restrictions, there is no regular vehicle ferry service for visitors to take their car to Avalon and the rest of Catalina Island. A taxi service is available to provide transportation in Avalon and throughout the island.

Public transportation within city limits is provided by the City of Avalon Seaside Transit (COAST), an on-demand service operated using small vans and shuttle vehicles, similar to Metro Micro on mainland LA County. Riders can book rides using the Circuit Transit app, website, or by phone. Fares start at $2 per rider, and this services operates seven days a week from 7 am to 9 pm.

== In popular culture ==
- The city was the inspiration for the 1920 popular song "Avalon", sung by Al Jolson.
- It is the port of embarkation for the narrator in the Crosby, Stills, & Nash song Southern Cross
