= Vail Airport, Montebello =

Airport in California, 1926–1953

Coordinates: 34.004°N 118.134°W

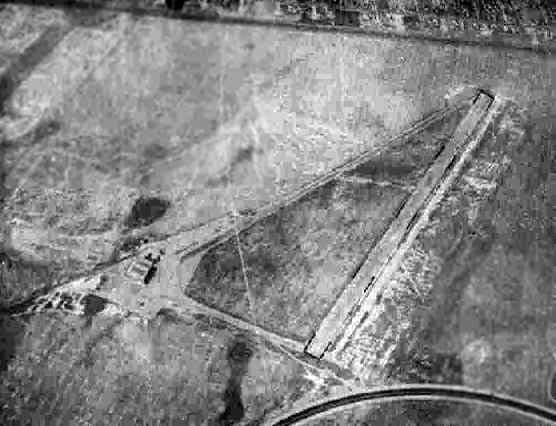
Vail Airport, Montebello in 1945

Vail Airport, Montebello was an airport in Montebello, California from 1926 to 1953. The airport was owned and operated by Western Air Express. Western Air Express purchased 700 acres of Vail farm to build the private airport from the Vail brothers. The vast airport was boarded by Telegraph Road on the south, Ferguson Drive on the north, Tusbway Avenue on the west, and Yates Avenue to the east. A group of Los Angeles entrepreneurs founded Western Air Express and the airport to cash in on the Air Mail Act of 1925 that opened up bidding on air mail contracts. Western Air Express purchased six Douglas mailplanes model M-2 to start the company. Western Air Express built two 2 unpaved runways running north–south in the middle of the lot, along the current Yates Avenue. A nearby movie studio building was turned into the main hangar and three more were built. Western Air Express won an airmail contract run from Las Vegas to Salt Lake City in 1926. In 1927 the local airport became famous as Charles Lindbergh landed The Spirit of St. Louis at the airport on a nationwide tour. Leland A. Bryant designed and built his racing aircraft at Vail Airport starting in 1927. Ryan Mechanics built the Lone Eagle CM-1 at Vail Airport in 1928.

In 1928 Western Air Express took over Pacific Marine Airways airport service at Hamilton Cove Seaplane Base on Catalina Island, California. In 1931 Western Air Express service which to using 10 passengers Douglas Dolphin, a twin-engined seaplane for the Hamilton Cove service. In 1931 the Western Air Express Hamilton Cove seabase service was taken over by Wilmington-Catalina Airline which was owned by the Wrigley family. The Union Oil Company supported a Glider Club at the airport in the 1930s. With its long 5,500-foot dirt runway it was found that gliders could be launch with fast cars on the runway. Western Air Express mail service moved to the new Alhambra Airport in 1930. To support the Korean War training, in 1950, 11th US Coast Guard Auxiliary District operated out of Vail Field operating search & rescue mission in all of southern California. Vail Field was closed in 1953, the hangars were moved to Alameda Street and used by the Belyea Trucking company. The site of Vail Airport is all commercial property today. Western Air Express later became part of Western Airlines.

Bryant Monoplane, registration NX705, experimental aircraft, was flown by Captain Arthur V. Rogers (1892-1927) a British World War 1 flying ace. Bryant cantilever monoplane was entered in the Dole Air Race from Oakland, California to Hawaii. For the race the NX705 was named Angel of Los Angeles. The NX705 designed by Leslie Bryan was unique, it had two engines in tandem, both a tractor the other a pusher plane. On August 11, 1927 Arthur Rogers took off from Vail Field for Angel of Los Angeles first flight. The plane took off and flow fine for seven minutes, returning for landing, at a low altitude of 150 feet, the plane dived. Rogers tried to bail out but was too low, the parachute failed to open in time and was killed instantly. Rogers was 35 at the time of his death, he had flown with the Lafayette Escadrille and had shot down 32 German planes.

The Ryan Mechanics Monoplane Company [RMMC] was founded by Oliver R. McNeel, B.A. Seitz, Fred C. Ayars, and Henry W. Hunold, all mechanics. Ryan Mechanics worked with the Los Angeles based Warren School of Aeronautics. They built a plane that looked a lot like the Spirit of St. Louis and called it the Lone Eagle CM-1 at Vail Airport. Lone Eagle was the nickname given to Charles Lindbergh, there was no sign that Lindbergh had any problems the used use of the nickname or anyone making a close copy of the Spirit of St. Louis. Ryan Mechanics renamed the company to Federal Aircraft Corporation in 1928 and later built one Federal Aircraft CM-3.

== Gallery ==
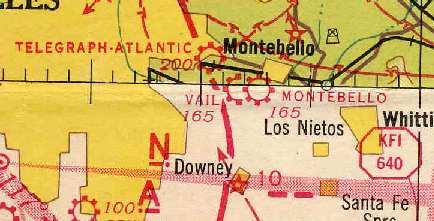
Map Vail Airport, Montebello in 1941

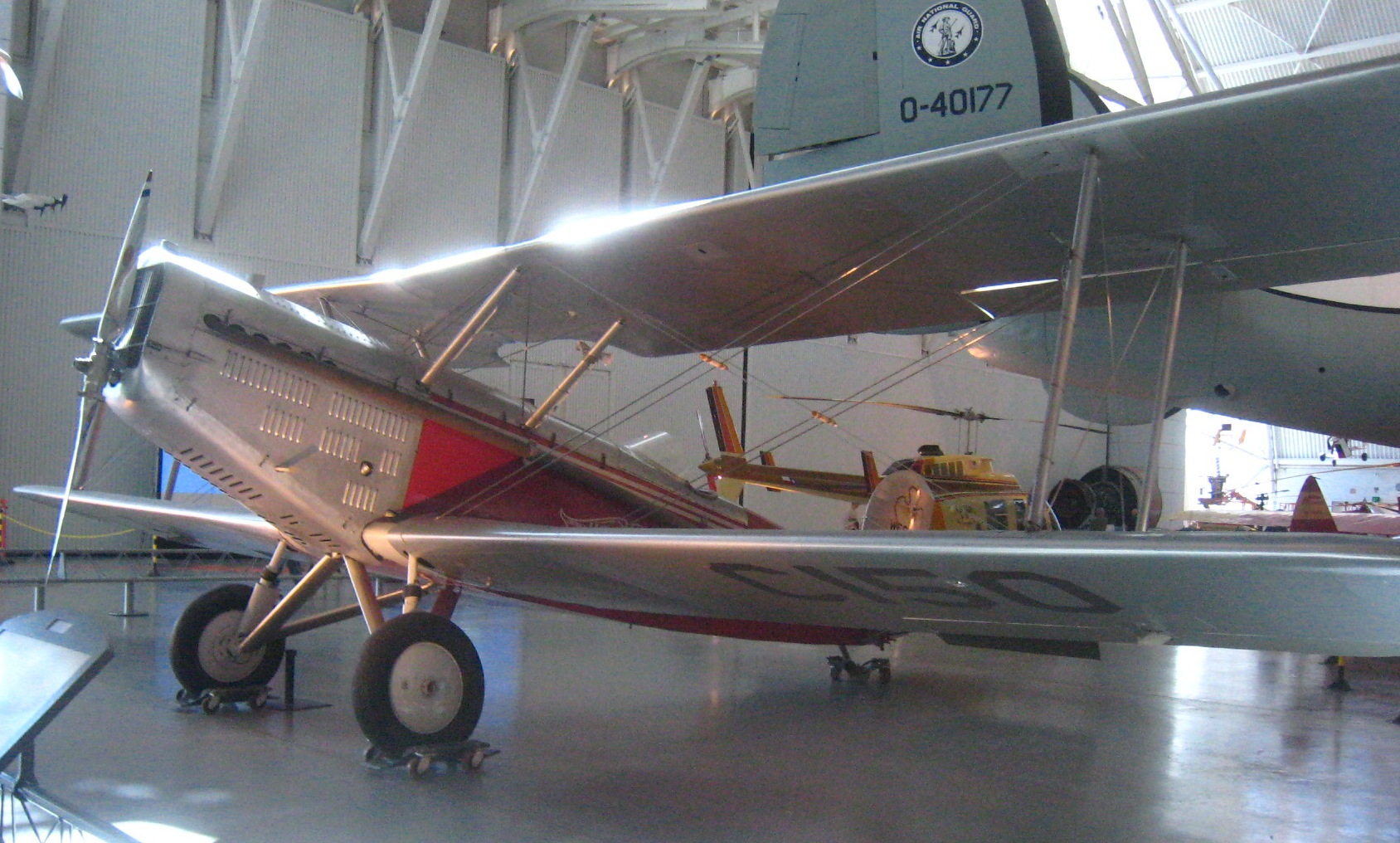
Douglas M-2 operated by Western Air Express

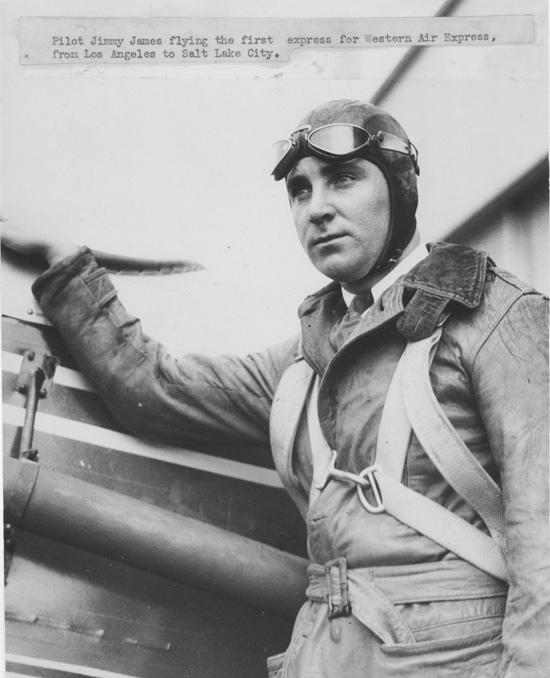
Jimmy James, first to fly Western Air Express airmail from Las Vegas to Salt Lake City in 1926

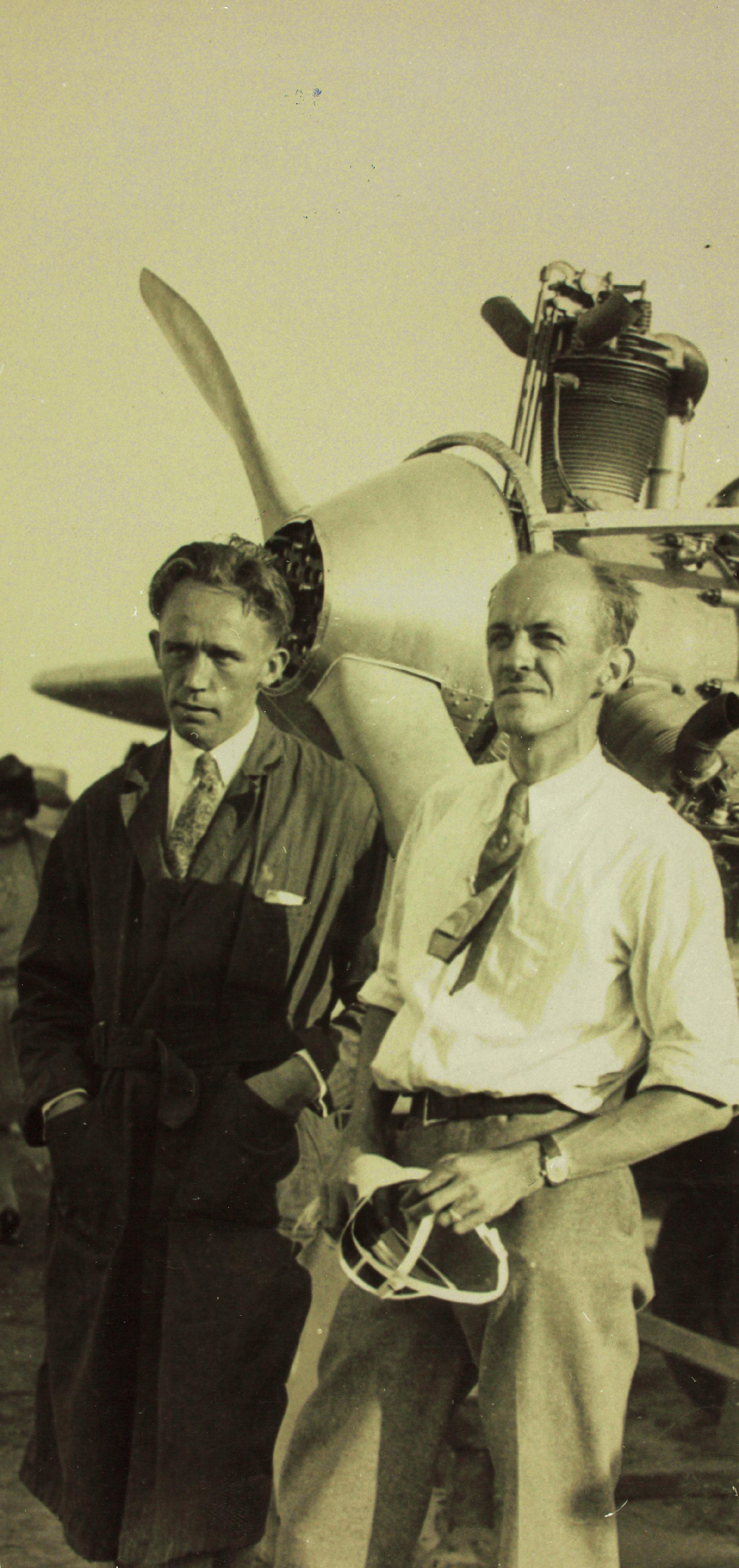
Leland A. Bryan (on right), Captain Arthur V. Rogers left, and his NX 705, built at Vail Airport

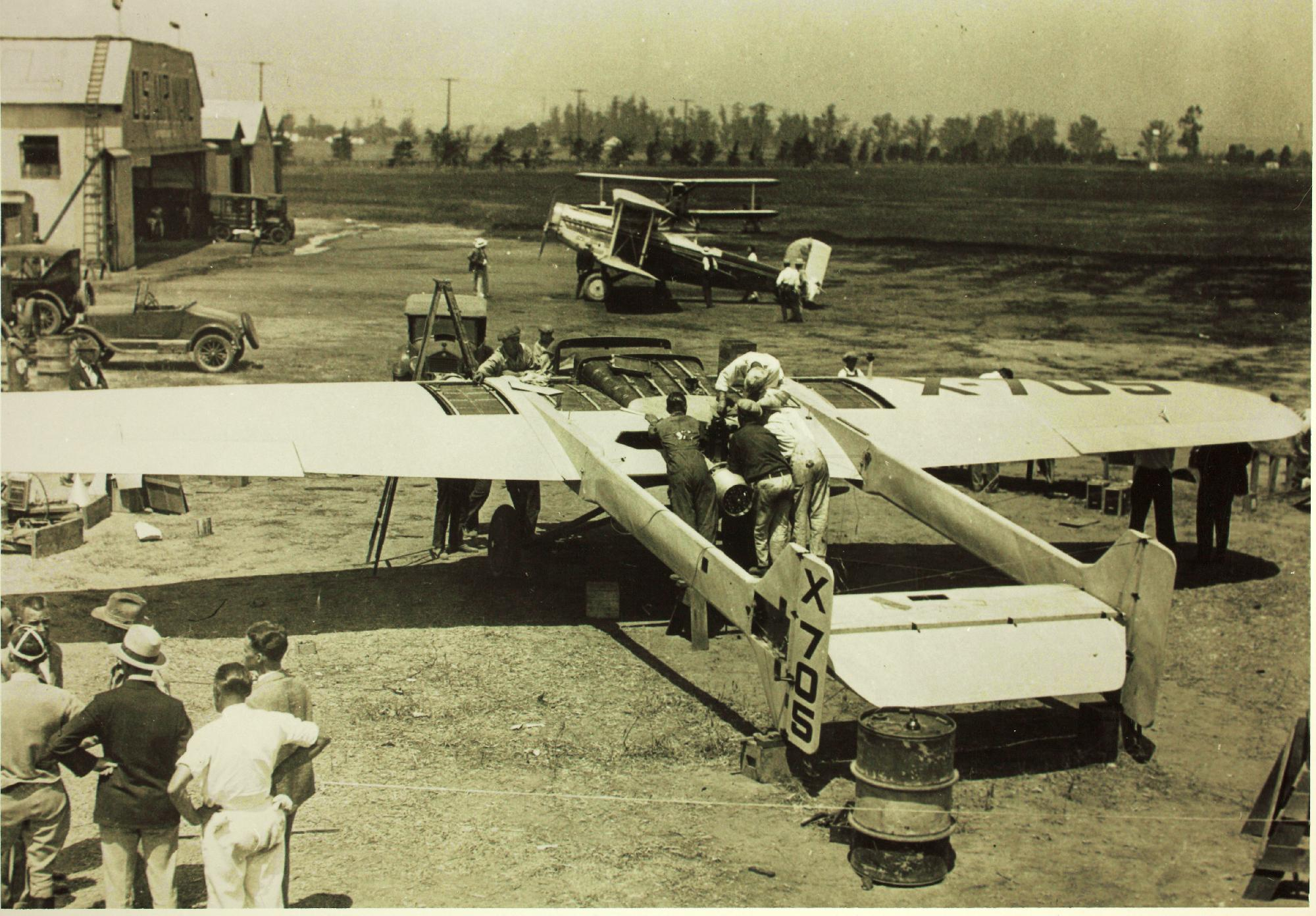
Leland A. Bryan's NX 705, built at Vail Airport

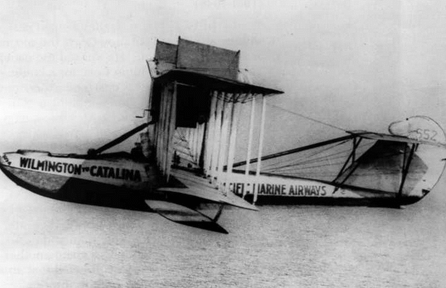
Pacific Marine Airways, Curtiss HS-2L in 1922, Western Air Express purchased and flew to Vail in 1928

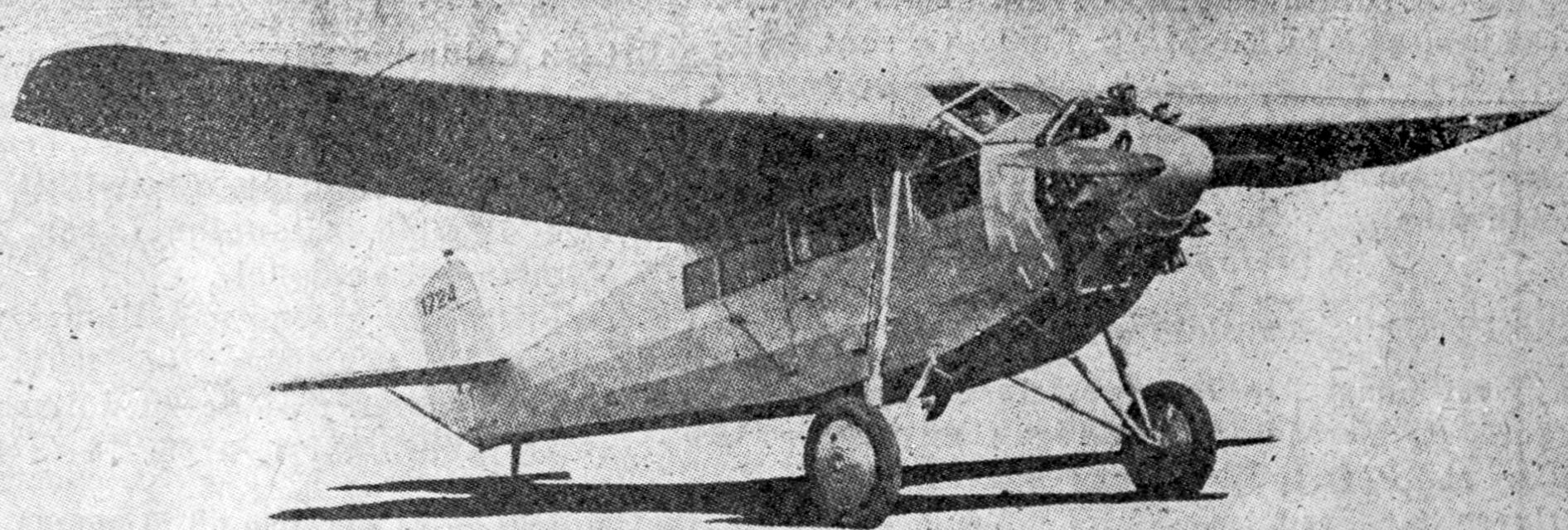
A Ryan Mechanics Lone Eagle CM-1, built at Vail Airport

== See also ==
- T. Claude Ryan
- Ryan Aeronautical
- California during World War II
- American Theater (1939–1945)
- United States home front during World War II
