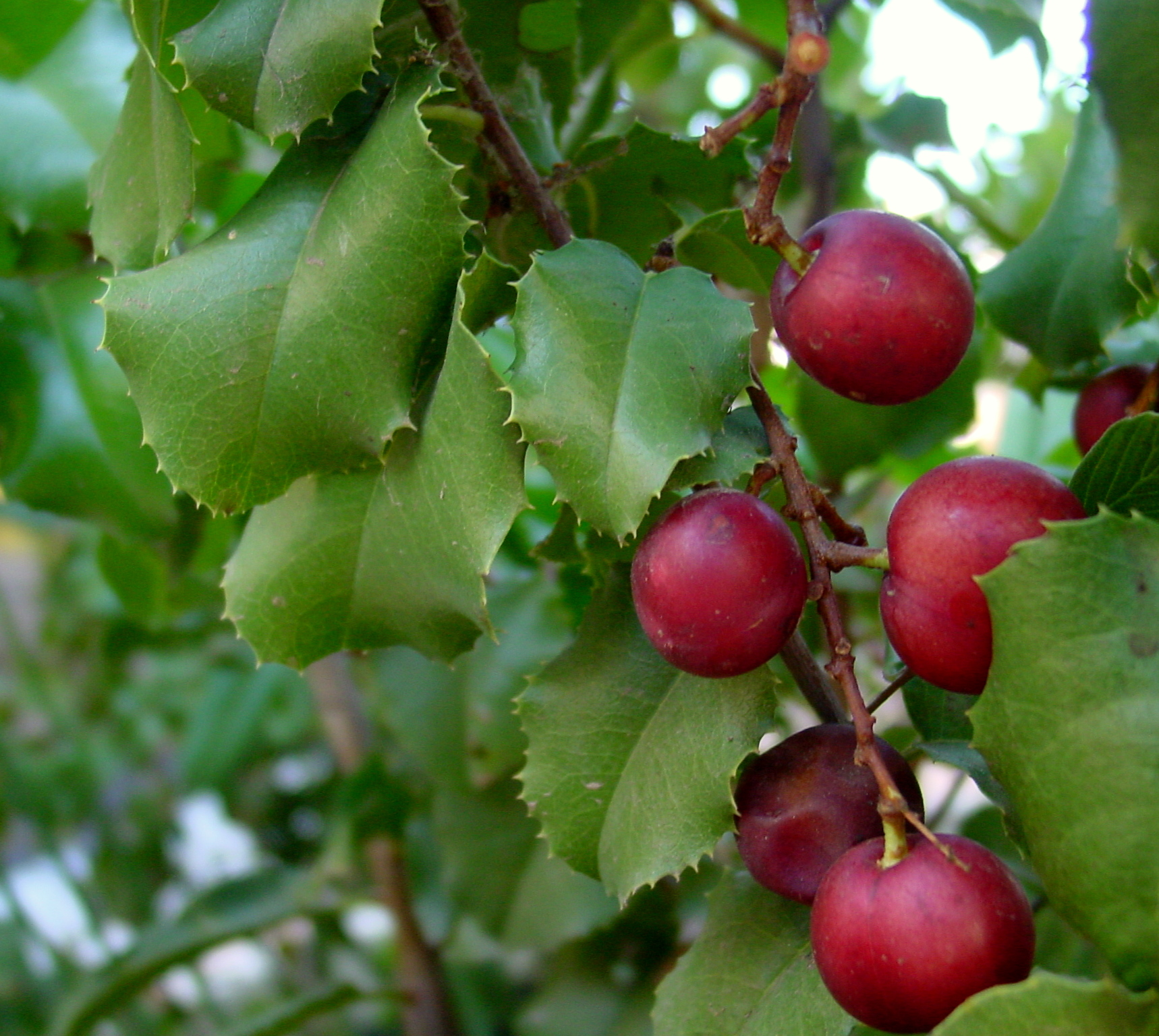

Conservation status
- Least Concern (IUCN 3.1)

Scientific classification
- Kingdom: Plantae
- Clade: Tracheophytes
- Clade: Angiosperms
- Clade: Eudicots
- Clade: Rosids
- Order: Rosales
- Family: Rosaceae
- Genus: Prunus
- Species: P. ilicifolia

Binomial name
- Prunus ilicifolia (Nutt. ex Hook. & Arn.) Walp.
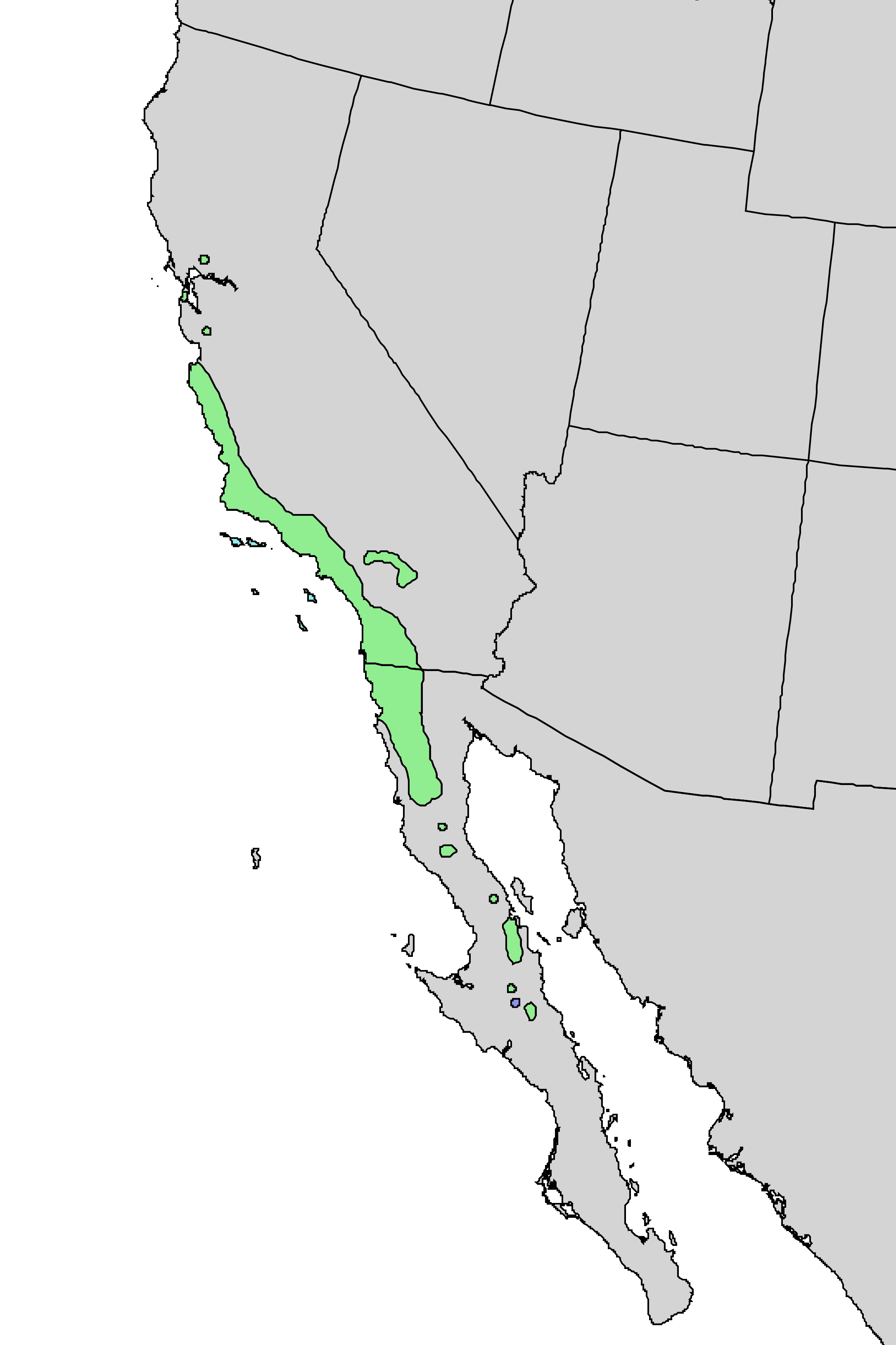
- Natural range of Prunus ilicifolia (var. ilicifolia green; var. occidentalis blue)

Synonyms
- Cerasus ilicifolia Nutt. ex Hook. & Arn.; Laurocerasus ilicifolia (Nutt. ex Hook. & Arn.) M.Roem.; Lauro-cerasus ilicifolia (Nutt. ex Hook. & Arn.) M.Roem.; Prunus lyonii (Eastw.) Sarg.

= Prunus ilicifolia =

Hollyleaf cherry

Species of tree

Prunus ilicifolia is a North American species of Prunus with the common names hollyleaf cherry, evergreen cherry, and in native Salinan, islay.

Prunus ilicifolia is an evergreen shrub or tree with shiny and spiny toothed leaves similar in appearance to those of holly. It grows to nearly 15 metres (49 feet) tall, with thick, alternate leaves 1.6–12 centimetres (3/4–4 3/4 inches) in length. It has small white flowers growing in clusters, similar in appearance to most members of the rose family. The purple to black fruit is a sweet drupe with a very thin pulp around a large single stone.

Despite its name, the species is not a true cherry. It is native to parts of the Californias in both the United States and Mexico. The plant is prized in horticulture, being showy and easily grown from seed, and has been cultivated for centuries as a food source. It tolerates twice yearly pruning when often used as a hedge. The fruit is edible, while the pit is toxic unless processed for consumption. The plant has various uses in Native American ethnobotany.

== Description ==
It is an evergreen shrub or small tree approaching 15 metres (49 feet) in height, with sclerophyllous foliage consisting of dense, hard, alternate leaves. The leaves are 1.6–12 centimetres (3/4–4 3/4 inches) long with a 4–25 millimetres (1/8–1 in) petiole and spiny margins, somewhat resembling those of the holly. The leaves are dark green when mature and generally shiny on top, and have a smell resembling almonds when crushed.

The flowers are small (1–5 mm), white, produced on racemes in the spring from March to May. The flowers are terminal on small stalks, with the youngest at the cluster center. The fruit is 12–25 mm (1/2–1 in) in diameter, sweet in taste, with little flesh surrounding the smooth seed.

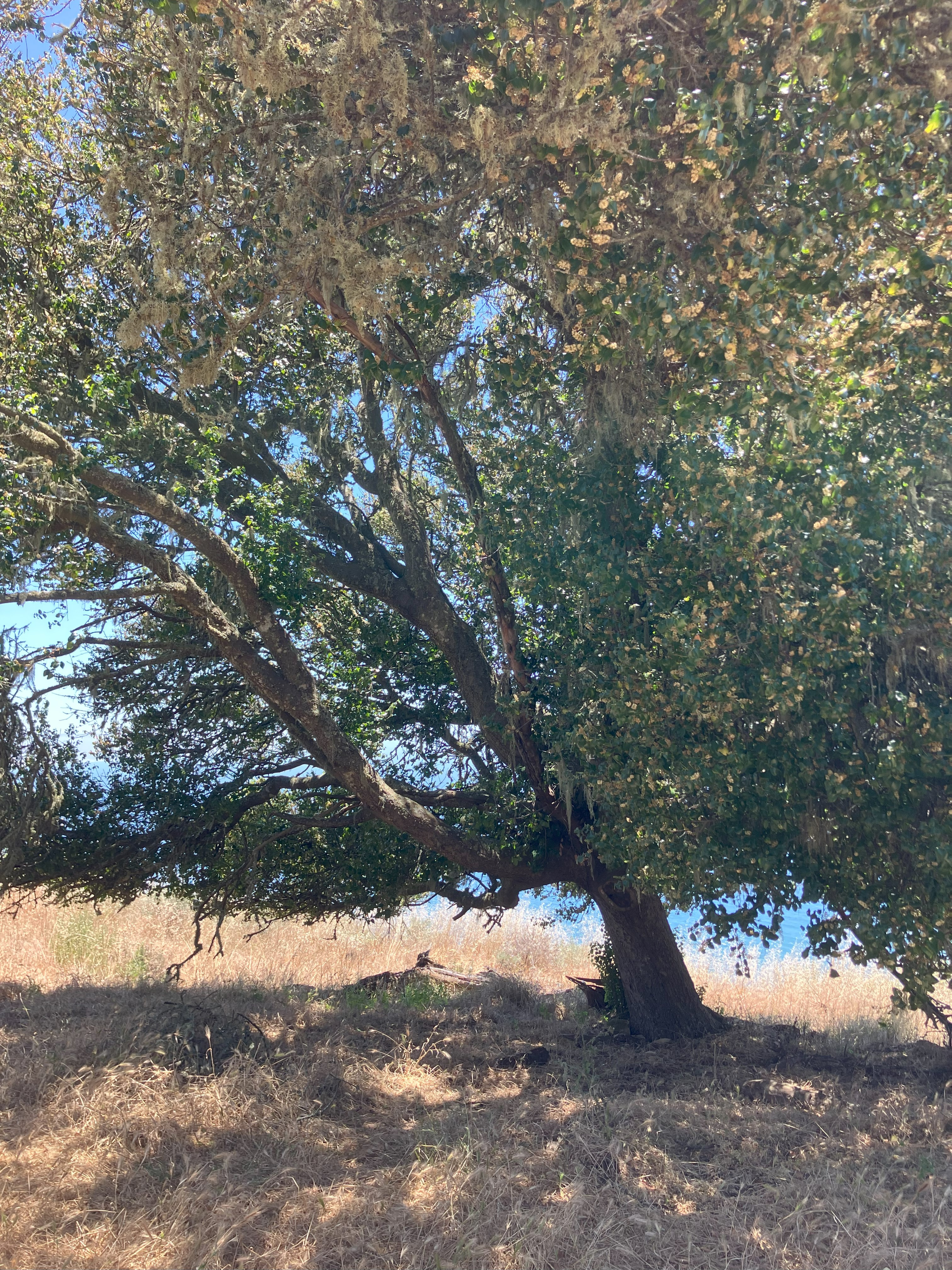
Large tree in Pismo Beach

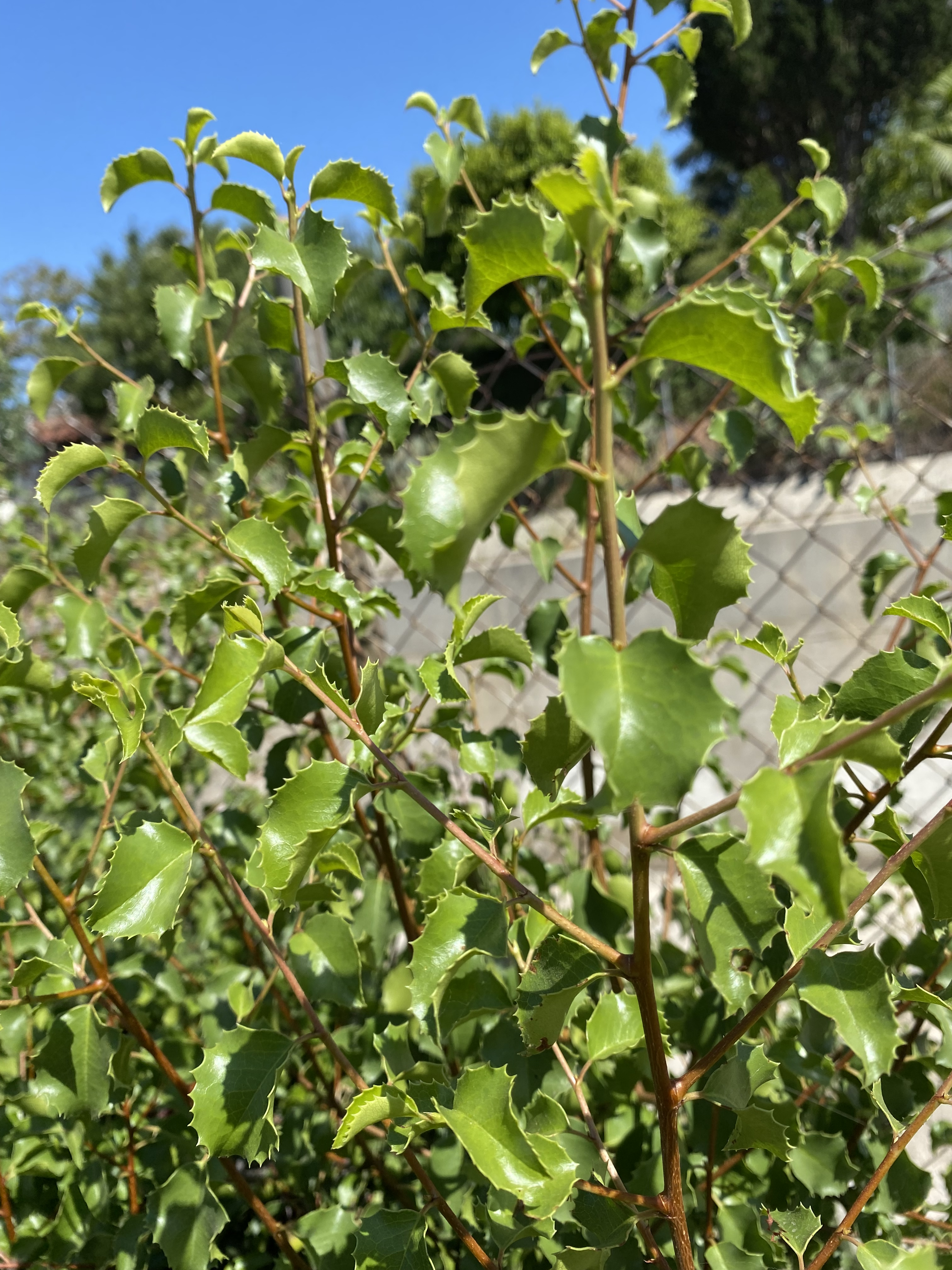
The holly-like leaves

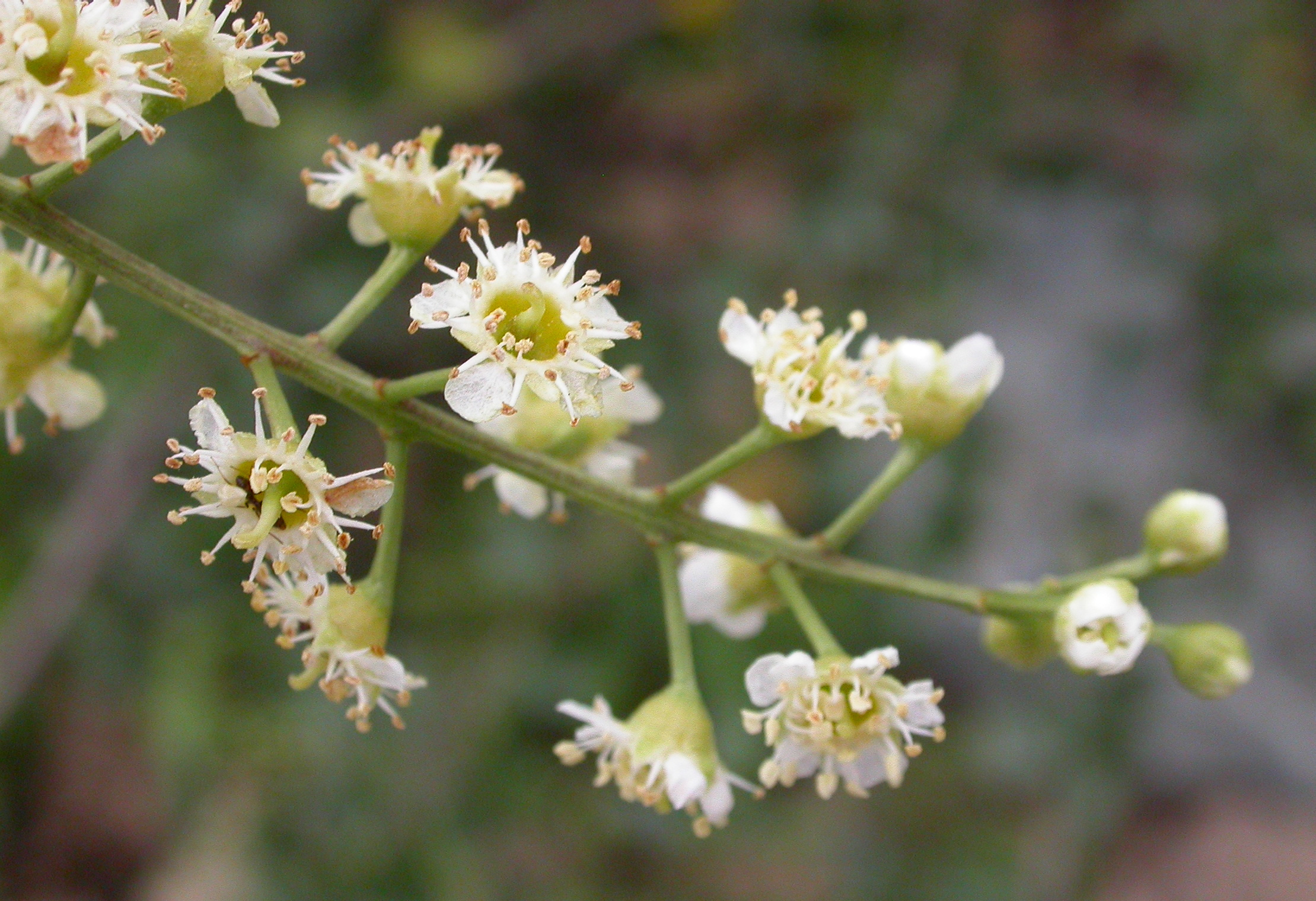
Flowers close-up

== Taxonomy ==
Despite its name, the species is not a true cherry (P. subg. Cerasus) species. It is traditionally included in P. subg. Laurocerasus, but molecular research indicates it is nested with species of P. subg. Padus.

=== Subtaxa ===
There are two subspecies:

- P. ilcifolia subsp. ilicifolia – mainland California and Baja California, red fruit 12–18 mm diameter, leaves dentate
- P. ilicifolia subsp. lyonii (Eastw.) Raven – Catalina cherry, Channel Islands of California (San Clemente, Santa Catalina, Santa Cruz and Santa Rosa Island islands), blue-black fruit 15–25 mm diameter, leaves entire

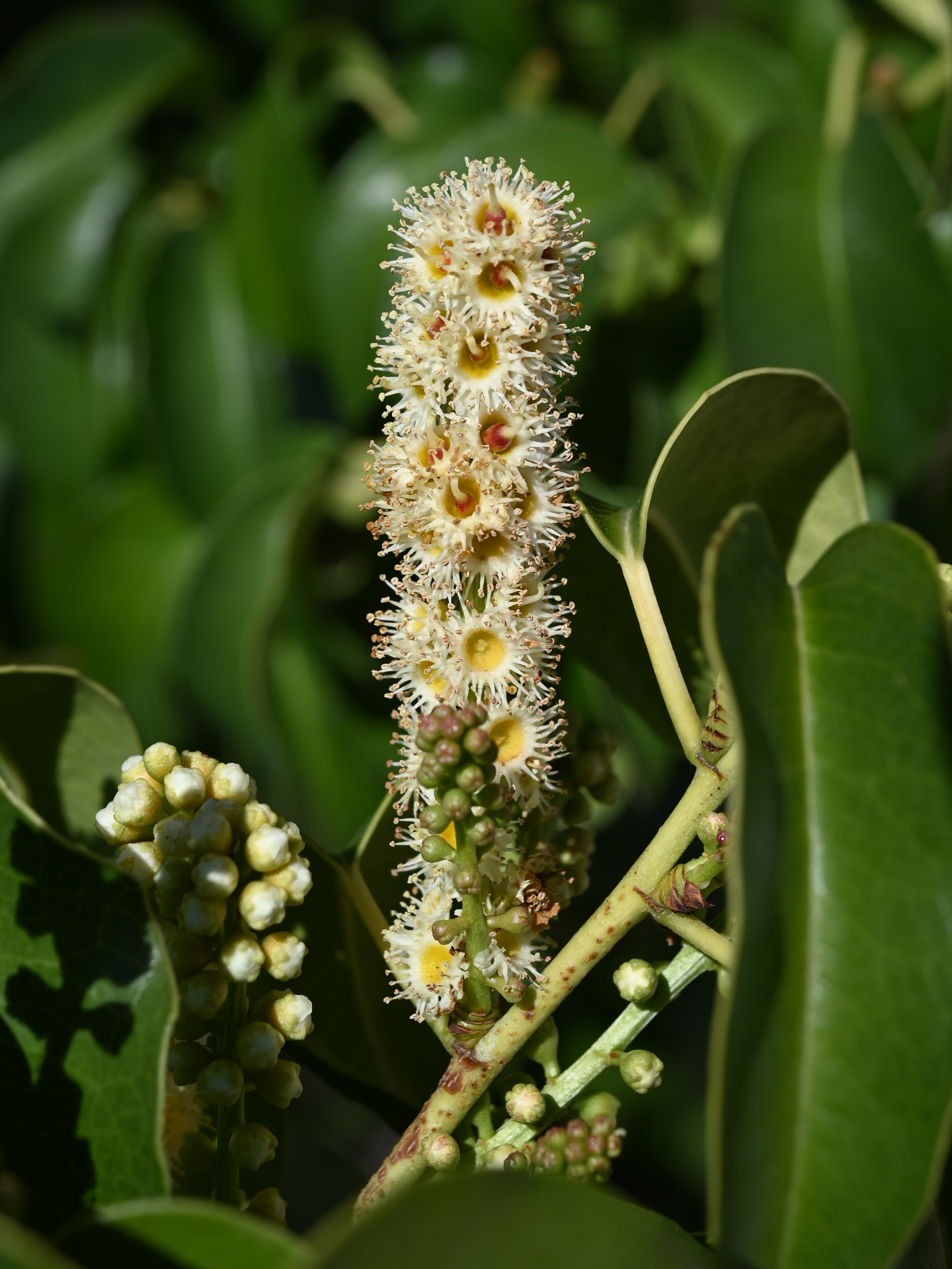
The flowers and smoother leaves of var. occidentalis

Additionally, there are two variants, var. ilicifolia and var. occidentalis.

=== Etymology ===
The similarity of the leaves to those of holly is the source of both the common name "holly-leaved cherry" and the scientific epithet ilicifolia (Ilex [holly]-leaved).

== Distribution and habitat ==
Prunus ilicifolia is native to California chaparral and foothill woodlands along the Coast Ranges below 1,600 m (5,200 ft). Its distribution extends from coastal California (from Mendocino County to San Diego County as well as desert chaparral areas of the Mojave Desert) to Baja California and areas of northern Baja California Sur. This is the only species of the genus Prunus native to California's Santa Monica Mountains, which divide the Los Angeles Basin from the San Fernando Valley.

In chaparral communities, it tends to inhabit north-facing slopes, erosion channels, or other moist, cool sites. It is a persistent member of chaparral communities, being slow-growing but long-lived; common chaparral flora associates are toyon, western poison-oak and coffeeberry. In the absence of fire, P. ilicifolia will outlive or outshade surrounding vegetation, making room for seedlings. Eventually, it will form extensive stands codominated by scrub oak.

== Ecology ==
Although it will resprout from the stump after fires, the seeds are not fire-adapted like those of many other chaparral plants. Instead, it relies on the natural death of surrounding vegetation during long periods of fire-free conditions to make room for its seedlings.

Though the seeds are often reported to require sunlight to germinate, germination rates of nearly 100% have been achieved with wild-collected seed buried completely in pots with a peatlite mix.

The caterpillars of the pale swallowtail (Papilio eurymedon) feed on this and other members of the riparian woodland plant community. It is also a larval host to the California hairstreak, Lorquin's admiral, Nevada buckmoth, and western tiger swallowtail. Bees are attracted to it.

== Cultivation ==
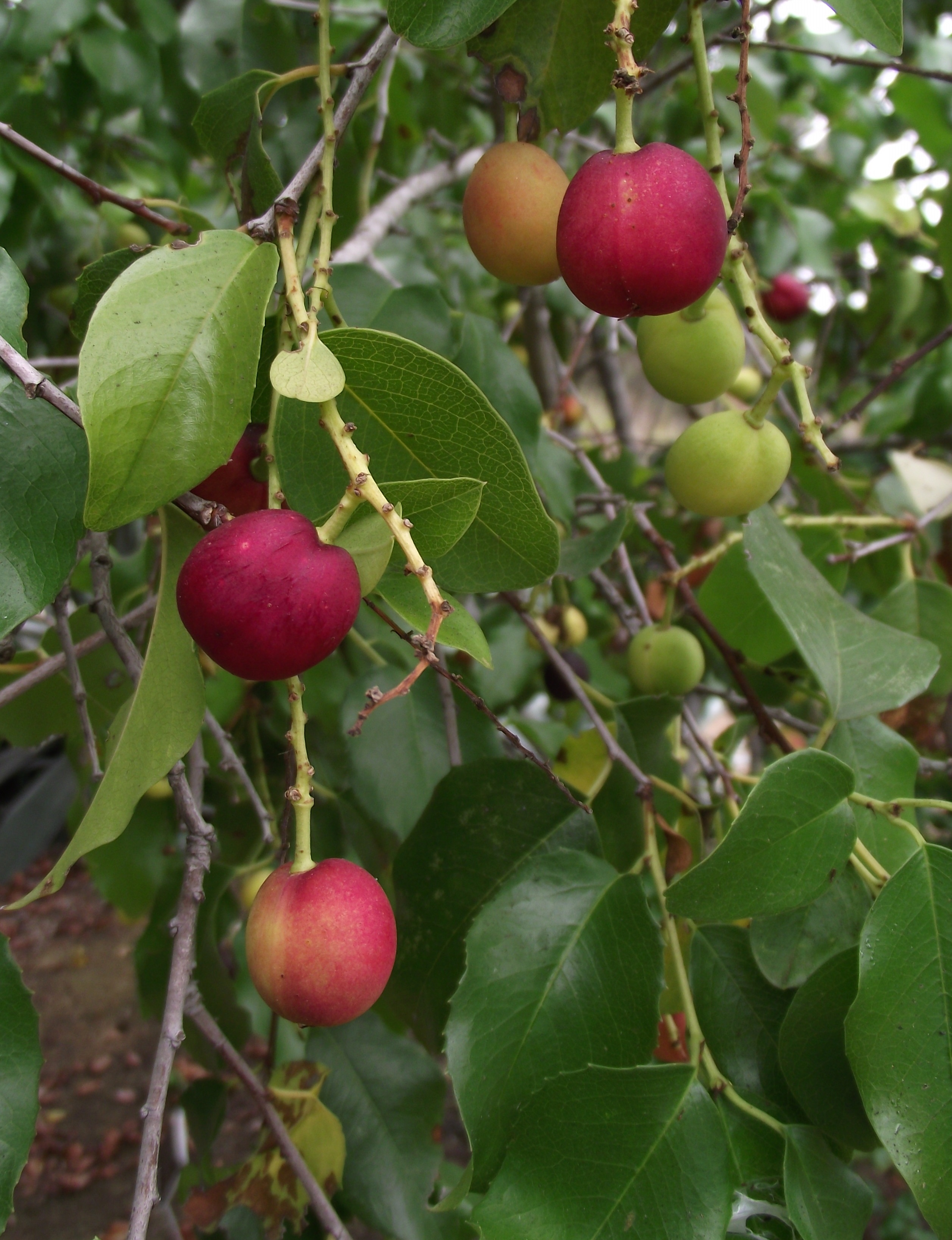
Ripening fruits of subsp. lyonii

Prunus ilicifolia is used in California native plants and wildlife gardens, and drought-tolerant sustainable landscaping. The plant thrives in full sun and loose open soil (porous), and needs regular watering when young.

=== Traditional harvest method ===
The cherries were picked in late summer by Chumash people. The tree was not beaten with sticks or climbed, as they said it was very delicate; instead, cherries were picked individually from the tree along with those fallen to the ground. Green cherries would also be picked, but stored separately.

To gather the cherries, Chumash people used net bags which were similarly employed to gather acorns and manzanita berries. The bags were hung over the chest by a woven strap which hung behind the neck or over the shoulder. Once filled, the bag was carried on the back with a tumpline. Gathered cherries would be emptied from their bags into larger, closely woven sacks with drawstrings which would be used to transport them further; often, the cherries would often be cleaned of their pulp near the gathering site, leaving the kernels to be transported alone for further processing.

The net bags were made using cordage which would be woven into meshes just fine enough to prevent the cherries from falling through and the resulting net bag's mouth would be kept open by a hoop made of willow or sumac wood. The nets were often made using a popular cordage called tok, made from dogbane. Where dogbane was scarce, cordage could be made from milkweed (Asclepias eriocarpa or A. fascicularis) which, being weaker than tok cordage, was woven into finer meshes, or less commonly, weaker nettle (Urtica) fibers. Net bags varied in size; those used by men were larger, measuring about 46 cm (18 in) long and 30 cm (12 in) in diameter when full.

== Toxicity ==
The pits are toxic to humans. The leaves are poisonous to eat, but not to handle.

== Uses ==
P. ilicifolia, according to Janice Timbrook, "was [consumed] by every group in whose territory it occurs", and is an important part of the ethnobotany of many California indigenous people in that range.

=== Consumption ===
==== Fruit pulp ====
The pulp of the cherry is edible, and the toxic pit kernels can be processed for consumption. The cherries and their seeds form a part of the traditional cuisine of multiple indigenous groups who inhabit the native range of P. ilicifolia.

Despite containing a small amount relative to the size of the pit, the cherry pulp is consumed both raw and processed. Prunus fruits in California were sometimes dried and stored for later use; the Payómkawichum are reported to have let the fruit sit for a few days to improve the taste, and the people of Santa Catalina Island are also reported to have dried the fruit. Chumash people would mash and spread the pulp on a flat rock to sun-dry, this dried mash would be rolled up and eaten like fruit leather. The fruit can also be made into a jam; as reported by Donald C. Peattie.

The fruit is also pressed into a juice, and some groups fermented the fruit into an intoxicating drink. In 1982, researcher Rita Weyrauch wrote that modern Chumash people remember the fruit being fermented to make a drink called teeswin. According to mission historian Maynard Geiger and UCLA anthropologist Clement W. Meighan, tesgüino was a mission-era introduction to California, as the Chumash had not made fermented beverages in prehistoric times.

==== Kernel ====
The processing and consumption of the pit kernels is an important part of the ethnobotany of indigenous groups in the Central Coast and Southern California, and northern Baja California, who made more use of the kernels than the relatively small amount of pulp; the groups which produce pit kernel meal from native Prunus species inhabit regions which coincides heavily with the natural range of P. ilicifolia, and this particular species is the only one consistently sought for its kernel.

Some also cracked the dried cherries and made meal from the seeds after grinding and leaching them. The method of preparation for the cherry was to first extract and crush the kernel in a mortar, and the resulting powder would then be leached in order to eliminate remaining harmful chemicals. The final step was to boil the leached powder into an atole. Once this process was completed, Native Californians would then make soup base, tortillas, or tamale-like foods using the resulting ground meal. Other times, the kernel would be kept whole, leached to remove its hydrocyanic acid content, roasted for a couple hours, and then used to make cakes or balls.

=== Medicinal ===
Aside from food, the hollyleaf cherry was also used for medicinal purposes by some Native Californian tribes, including the Diegueño and the Cahuilla. Specifically, infusions made from the bark and roots of hollyleaf cherry plants would be used as treatment for common colds and coughs.

=== Ornamental ===
P. ilicifolia can be used as a garden hedge, being able to endure twice-yearly pruning. The spring flowers and green new growth are especially regarded as beautiful.

=== Ceremonial ===
As part of Chumash religious observances, offerings were made at shrines and sacred locations. The seeds of P. ilicifolia were among the most common offerings. Prepared islay balls were an important part of ceremonial occasions.
