= Wilmington-Catalina Airline =

Seaplane airline to Santa Catalina Island (1931–1942)

Wilmington-Catalina Airline Catalina Air Transport
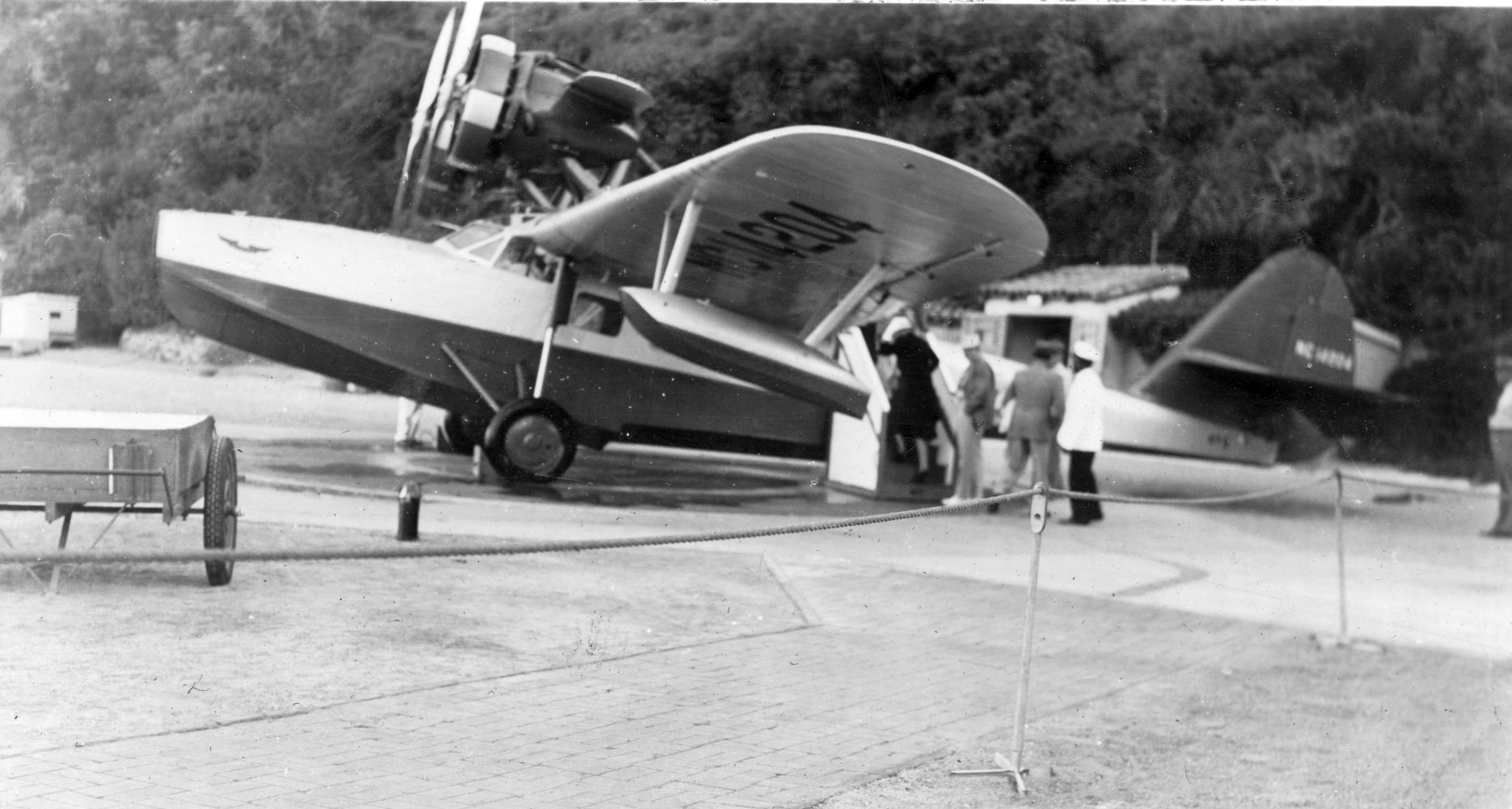
- Douglas Dolphin on the turntable at Santa Catalina Island
- Founded: 12 May 1931 (incorporated in California)
- Commenced operations: June 1931
- Ceased operations: 23 June 1942
- Operating bases: Hamilton Cove Seaplane Base
- Fleet size: 2
- Destinations: 2
- Headquarters: Avalon, California; United States
- Key people: Philip K. Wrigley

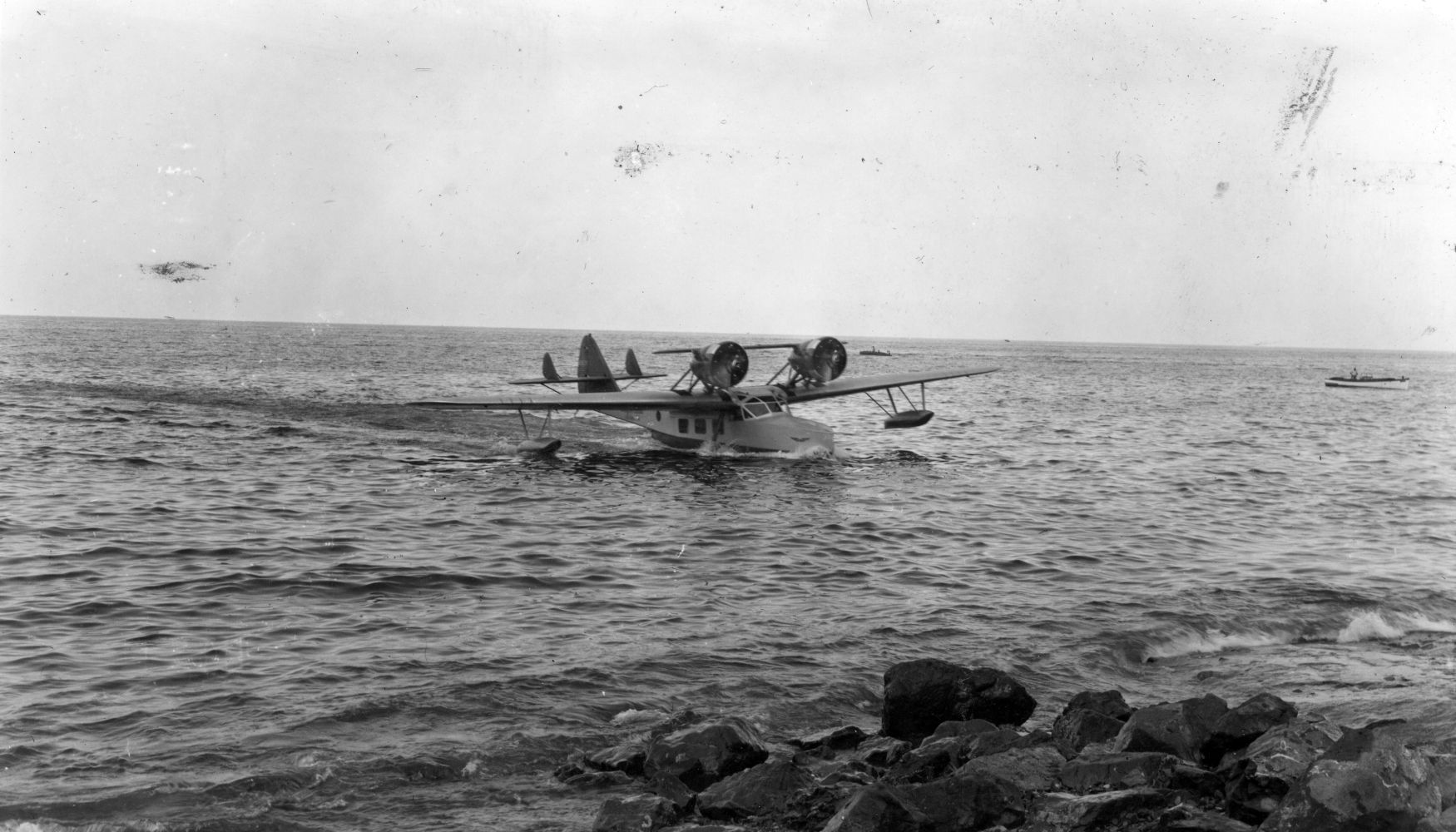
Douglas Dolphin

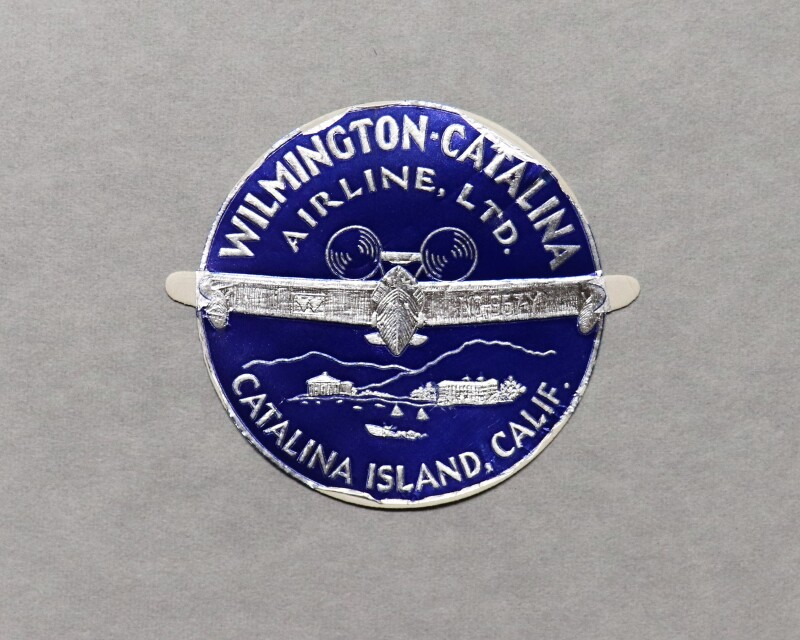
Emblem circa 1934

Wilmington-Catalina Airline, Ltd. (WCA) was a US scheduled airline founded in 1931 by the Wrigley family of chewing gum fame to provide air transportation with amphibious aircraft on the 30-mile flight from Wilmington, California to Santa Catalina Island. In 1941, the name of the company changed to Catalina Air Transport (CAT) in anticipation of changing to land-based aircraft, but it ceased operation in June 1942 as a result of World War II. After the war, United Air Lines provided service to the island under contract to CAT until 1954. In 1955 CAT formally lost its airline certificate and the company dissolved in 1956.

Despite the airline’s modest size, WCA was captured by the 1938 Civil Aeronautics Act and was thus certificated in 1939–1940 as a scheduled airline by the Civil Aeronautics Authority (CAA) on the basis of flying domestic scheduled service prior to the passage of Act (“grandfathering”). This put WCA in the same regulatory category as trunk carriers such as United, American Airlines, Eastern Air Lines and other far larger airlines certificated the same way.

External links has a link to video footage of the airline.

== History ==
=== Startup ===
William Wrigley Jr. gained control of Santa Catalina Island in 1919 and developed much of the infrastructure there in the 1920s, such as the Catalina Casino. In 1931, Wrigley decided to provide air service to the island directly rather than relying on Western Air Express, an effort led by his son, Philip K. Wrigley through Wilmington-Catalina Airline. WCA incorporated in California on May 12, 1931. By June the airline was operating from Wilmington, California (home of the Port of Los Angeles) to the Hamilton Cove Seaplane Base north of Avalon on Santa Catalina, initially with two Loening amphibians, but replaced in July and September by two ten-passenger Douglas Dolphin aircraft. The Wrigleys built a $250,000 custom facility for the airline, including a hangar and administration building, at Hamilton Cove, Santa Catalina, known as Catalina Airport. This should not be confused with the current Catalina Airport, a conventional airport for land-based aircraft located at the highest point on the island. The service was said to be the favorite of “film folk” such as Douglas Fairbanks and “yachtsmen” who accessed their boats docked at the island. The fare was five dollars each way (over $100 in 2024 dollars) with an initial schedule of six flights in each direction daily. A 1 June 1934 timetable shows five to seven flights per day and a $4.75 one way fare, $8 round trip, whereas a return steamer passage was $2.25.

The Santa Catalina facility was famous for its compact site and considered the smallest airport in the world. Arriving aircraft would land on the water, go up a ramp and park on a turntable, which would rotate the aircraft 180 degrees, allowing it to reverse the aircraft despite limited room. See External links for a photo of the base, a Dolphin on the turntable.

=== Certification ===
The 1938 Civil Aeronautics Act placed almost all air transport under the tight control of the Civil Aeronautics Authority (CAA). In 1940, the Civil Aeronautics Board (CAB) inherited this regulatory function from the CAA. Intrastate airlines, those that flew within a single state and made an effort to not participate in interstate commerce, were exempt from CAA/CAB regulation, but the CAA determined that WCA was not an intrastate carrier, because at 30 miles offshore, most of the water between Santa Catalina and the California mainland (outside of a three-mile limit) was federal jurisdiction and overflying that meant legally leaving California. So WCA, despite flying a 30-mile route between two California points, required federal certification. WCA was entitled to such a certificate due to grandfathering; it had provided bona fide scheduled service prior to the Act. The CAA certificated WCA on 13 October 1939.

=== Catalina Air Transport, land-planes and war ===
On 9 January 1941, WCA changed its name to Catalina Air Transport (CAT). The CAB approved the name change on 22 July 1941 along with a proposed CAT move to land-based planes. The Douglas Dolphins were too small (WCA was turning away up to 30% of customers at peak times) and uncomfortable. Santa Catalina Island now had a suitable facility, Buffalo Springs Airport, today's Catalina Airport. The airline also wanted to fly closer to where its customers lived (closer to downtown LA or Hollywood), rather than forcing them make a 25+ mile trip to the Port of Los Angeles in Wilmington. The CAB approved plans for CAT to acquire two 17-passenger Lockheed Lodestars, which, during peak summer periods, would fly nonstop to Catalina from Los Angeles Union Air Terminal and Long Beach Airport, and during wintertime, fly Los Angeles-Long Beach-Catalina. 10 years after it started flying, CAT still charged $5 one way and proposed to continue that once it started flying the Lodestars.

But there was a route moratorium in place. Since April the CAB had agreed to hold off on new routes until the national defense emergency was over. The US government was increasingly concerned about the ambitions of the Axis powers and in May, President Franklin D. Roosevelt had declared a national emergency. So CAT would have to wait to until this cleared. That obviously took some time, given the entry of the US into World War II following the attack on Pearl Harbor. 23 June 1942 was CAT’s last operation after the military started to requisition its aircraft.

=== United Air Lines era ===
In June 1946, the CAB approved a post-war plan by CAT to outsource its flying to United. United was responsible for marketing and bore the profit risk, but had exclusive rights to fly to Catalina. It set fares jointly with CAT and paid 25 cents per passenger to use Catalina Airport, subject to yearly minimum and maximum. United did not merge with CAT, it just used CAT’s route authority with the agreement of the CAB. This allowed CAT to avoid what it said would be $200,000 to restore its own service (over $3.2mm in 2024 dollars). Either party could exit the agreement, which was renewable every year, with 90 days notice. The CAB also noted that WCA/CAT had run mostly at a deficit from 1936 to 1941 and had about a 4% market share of all trips to Catalina (including sea traffic). United service started July 1, 1946 with 21 passenger Douglas DC-3s. The route showed considerable seasonality. United's 4 January 1953 schedule showed two flights per day, whereas the 1 August 1954 schedule had 17 per day, a mixture of nonstop flights from Los Angeles (both Burbank and Los Angeles International Airports) as well as one-stops via Long Beach. United gave notice that it would cease the route as of 1 October 1954, citing the specialized, sightseeing and seasonal nature of the flights. The CAB held United onto the route until 1 November 1954.

Thereafter, CAT got the CAB to agree that it could suspend service until May 1955. In March 1955, it requested an additional five year suspension from the CAB, which instead ordered it to start service by 1 August. CAT, instead, applied in May to abandon the route and its certificate. It said it could not profitably operate a DC-3 on the routes. The CAB noted that there was already replacement service from air taxis (airlines operating small aircraft that in 1952 the CAB had decided to no longer regulate), and that a number of airlines had applied to be certificated on the route in CAT's place. So in September 1955, the CAB stripped CAT of its route authority and certificate as requested. Incorporation records show CAT filing for dissolution in 1956.

== Fleet ==
- 2 Douglas Dolphin

== Destinations ==
=== 1931–1942 ===
During this period, WCA/CAT was operating seaplanes on its own behalf:

- Wilmington, California (Port of Los Angeles)
- Catalina Airport

=== 1946–1954 ===
United Air Lines operating DC-3s under CAT's certification:

- Los Angeles
- Burbank

• Santa Catalina Island

== Incidents and accidents ==
- On 2 November 1933 a flight crashed on takeoff from Catalina. No passengers were onboard, but the co-pilot and the company manager were killed and the pilot seriously injured.
