= Hamilton Cove Seaplane Base =

Closed airsea port at Santa Catalina Island, California, United States

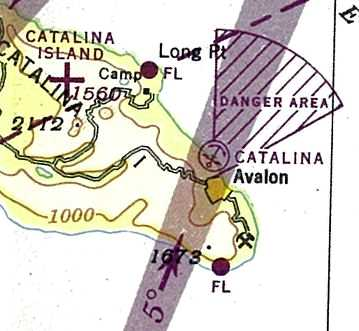
- Map Hamilton Cove Seaplane Base in 1945, danger area is the landing zone.
- IATA: none; ICAO: none

Summary
- Airport type: Private
- Serves: Avalon
- Elevation AMSL: 0 ft / 0 m
- Coordinates: 33.353292°N 118.329303°W

Map
- Location of Hamilton Cove Seaplane Base

Runways
Direction	Length		Surface
Direction	ft	m	Surface
			Sea

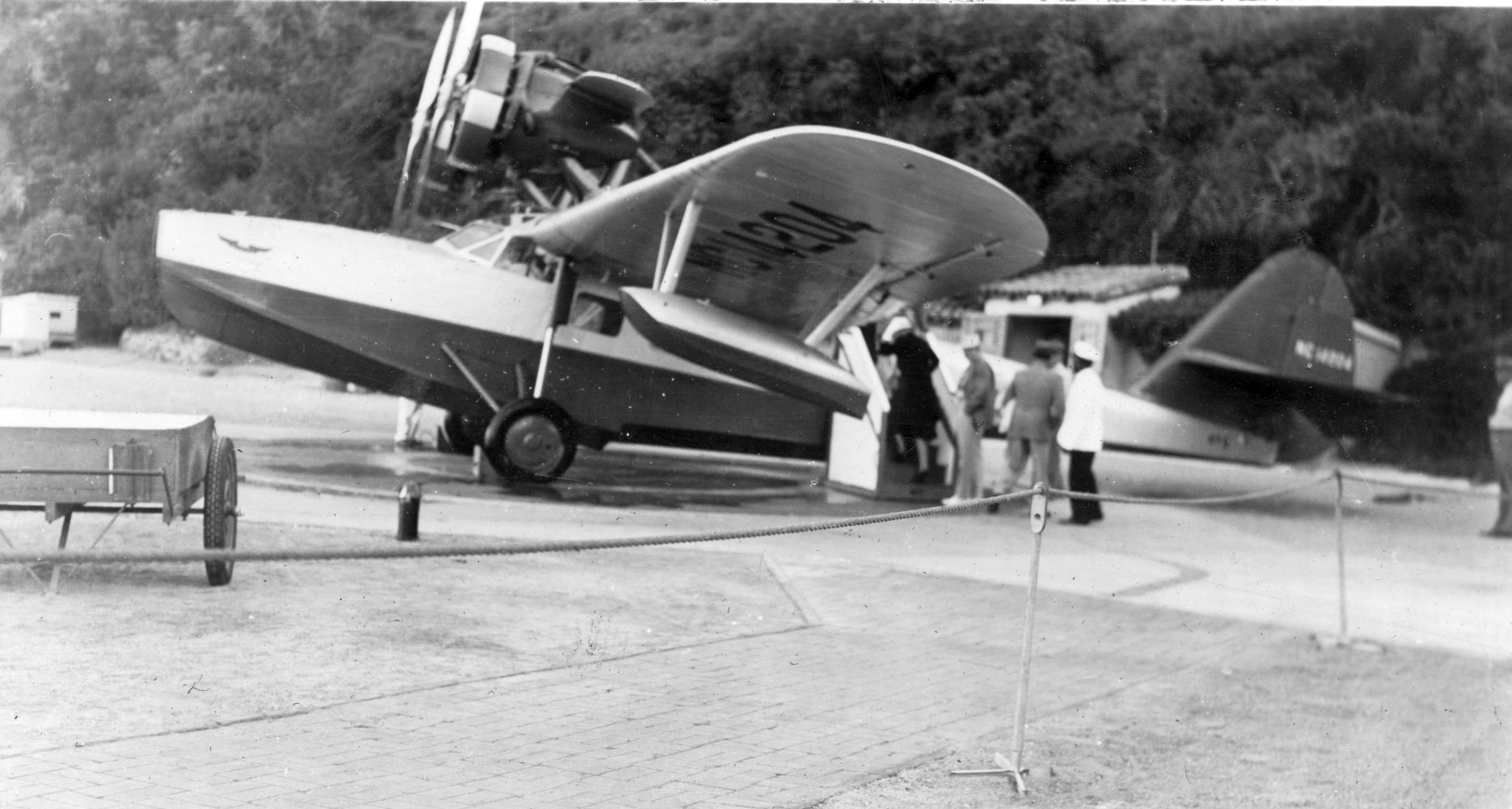
Douglas Dolphin of Wilmington-Catalina Airline on the turntable

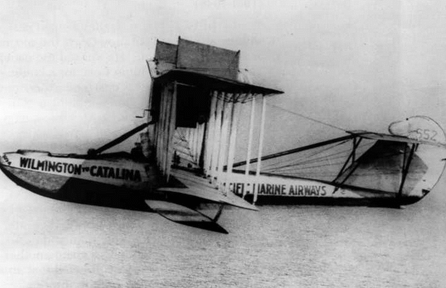
Pacific Marine Airways, Curtiss HS-2L in 1922

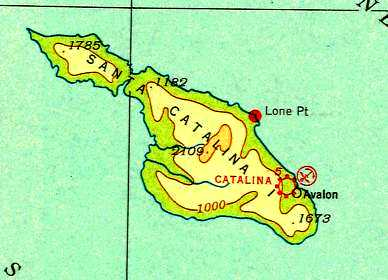
Santa Catalina Island Airfields map from 1934, Hamilton Cove is the anchor above Avalon

Hamilton Cove Seaplane Base was a seaplane base on the Catalina Island, California, from 1922 to 1947. The Seaplane Base was located just north of the city of Avalon, California in Hamilton Cove. Pacific Marine Airways operated out of the base with service between Wilmington, Los Angeles, and Catalina Island from 1922 to 1928. This was a popular vacation route to the island and had 3,500 passengers in 1927, running two 20-minute rides a day. Pacific Marine Airways was started by Foster Curry, Curry Village in Yosemite National Park was his previous project. Pacific Marine Airways started operations with World War 1 Curtiss HS-2L flying boats converted to 6 passenger planes. The amphibious seaplanes would land just offshore and then taxi up a ramp to the "airport". In 1928 Pacific Marine Airways switched to Loening C-2 seaplanes and moved from Wilmington to Mines Field now LAX. In 1928 Western Air Express took over operations and moved operations to an airport they owned, Vail Airport in Montebello, California. In 1931 Western Air Express service switched to using the 10 passenger Douglas Dolphin, a twin-engined seaplane.

In 1931 the seabase was taken over by Wilmington-Catalina Airline which was owned by the Wrigley family, which owned much of the island. The Wrigleys built the airline a compact base that featured a turntable at the top of the ramp to turn the aircraft. External links has a picture of the base. With the start of World War 2 all civilian air traffic stopped. All Catalina Island airports were shut down in September 1942. The US Coast Guard took over the Hamilton Cove Seaplane Base. In 1945, after World War 2 the Hamilton Cove Seaplane Base reopened but did not offer regularly scheduled flights. In 1947 the Hamilton Cove Seaplane Base closed as there was now a land-based airport, Catalina Airport (The Airport in the Sky) and a new seabase in Descanso Bay south of Avalon, home of the Saint Catherine Hotel (1918-1966). The hangar was moved to the land airport and all other traces of the terminal at Hamilton Cove were demolished for the condominium complex built in the early 1970s, the Hamilton Cove condominiums.

The Hamilton Cove Seaplane Base service had only one accident, on November 2, 1933 a seaplane with no passengers crashed. The plane after taking off in the morning overturned and crashed. In the crash, Elliott McFarlane Moore, the manager of Wilmington-Catalina Airlines, and the co-pilot George R. Baker, were instantly killed. W. L. Seiler, the Senior pilot, was found unconscious and rushed to Catalina Hospital.

== See also ==
- California during World War II
- American Theater (1939–1945)
- United States home front during World War II
