= Catalina Airport =

Airport at Santa Catalina Island, California, United States

Catalina Airport Buffalo Springs Airport
- Aerial view of the airport from the northwest

- Catalina Airport runway diagram
- IATA: AVX; ICAO: KAVX; FAA LID: AVX; WMO: 72292

Summary
- Airport type: Public
- Owner: Catalina Island Conservancy
- Serves: Avalon, Santa Catalina Island
- Elevation AMSL: 1,602 ft (488 m)
- Coordinates: 33°24′18″N 118°24′57″W
- Website: catalinaconservancy.org/recreation/airport-in-the-sky

Map
- Location of Catalina Airport

Runways
Direction	Length		Surface
Direction	ft	m	Surface
4/22	3,000	914	Concrete

Statistics (2006)
- Aircraft operations: 23,000
- Based aircraft: 10
- Source: Federal Aviation Administration

Catalina Airport (IATA: AVX, ICAO: KAVX, FAA LID: AVX) is a privately owned airport located 6.4 miles (10.3 km) northwest of the central business district of Avalon, California, United States, in the middle of Catalina Island. The airport is open to the public and allows general aviation aircraft to land there. The airport is primarily used for general aviation. The airport is also used for airfreight from the mainland. Supplies for the island are delivered daily.

The airfield is known as the "Airport in the Sky" because it lies near the island's highest point at an elevation of 1,602 ft (488 m).

The airport currently has no scheduled passenger service.

== History ==
Catalina Island was developed as a tourist site beginning in the 1920s by William Wrigley Jr., who owned most of the island under the Santa Catalina Island Company. In 1941 his son Philip K. Wrigley, among others, built a runway on the island by blasting and leveling two hills and filling the canyon between them to create a leveled area. The airport opened as Buffalo Springs Airport in the spring of 1941, as a private airport. Prior to this, the island's only air access was via the Hamilton Cove Seaplane Base, just north of Avalon.

=== World War II ===
In the autumn of 1942 the United States Army Air Forces (USAAF) took control of the Buffalo Springs Airport for the duration of World War II, to support Army, Navy, Coast Guard, Maritime Service, and Office of Strategic Services activities on the island. It was also a USAAF Fourth Air Force Replacement Training Station. The airfield operated during that time as a sub-base of March Field, located in Riverside County.

At the conclusion of the war, the military presence departed. A California aviation veteran, Richard Probert (1907–2008), worked to have Buffalo Springs Airport opened to the public. To that end he built a terminal building, and in 1946 the field began operating as a public use airport, called Catalina Airport.

=== Former passenger airline service ===
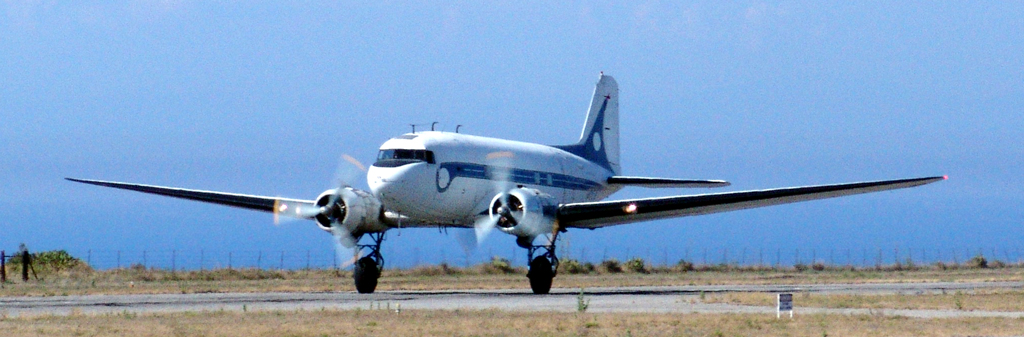
Douglas DC-3 at Catalina Airport

In the early 1950s, United Airlines served the airport with scheduled passenger service with nonstop flights to Long Beach Airport and direct, one-stop service to Los Angeles International Airport operated with Douglas DC-3 aircraft. During the mid-1950s, Catalina Air Lines was operating de Havilland Dove twin propeller aircraft on nonstop flights to Los Angeles International and Burbank Airport (now Bob Hope Airport). By the late 1950s, Pacific Air Lines was providing flights with Douglas DC-3 aircraft to Los Angeles International, Long Beach Airport, and Burbank Airport.

In the late 1960s, Catalina-Vegas Airlines was operating nonstop service to San Diego Lindbergh Field.

Golden West Airlines provided flights during the early 1970s with de Havilland Canada DHC-6 Twin Otter short takeoff and landing STOL capable twin turboprop aircraft with nonstop service to Los Angeles (LAX) and Orange County Airport (SNA, now John Wayne Airport). Golden West also acquired Catalina Air Lines, which served the island with seaplane flights operated from Avalon and Two Harbors.

In 1979, the Official Airline Guide (OAG) listed hourly shuttle service operated by Trans Catalina Airlines with small Piper Aircraft prop airplanes from both Orange County Airport (SNA) and Long Beach Airport (LGB) with eleven daily flights operated every hour on the hour from 8:00 am to 6:00 pm from both airports on the mainland to the Catalina Airport.

In 1987, Resort Commuter Airlines operating as a Trans World Express air carrier on behalf of Trans World Airlines (TWA) was flying nonstop service to Los Angeles (LAX) and the Orange County Airport (SNA).

=== Film shoots ===
Some exterior shots in the movie The In-Laws were shot at Catalina Airport, it doubling as a rural Latin airport. The tower is readily identifiable.

=== Repairs ===
After some seventy years of use, the asphalt runway was in poor condition, requiring hundreds of thousands of dollars annually in maintenance. The Aeronautics Division of Caltrans directed the Catalina Island Conservancy to create a long-term repair plan. The Conservancy worked with the Marines at Camp Pendleton, whose forces performed the repairs as a training exercise in January 2019. An encampment was erected at the airport to support the 120-man crew, and by 3 May the runway was reopened for operation. The work cost about five million dollars, paid by the airport owners. The first airplane to land on the 3,000 ft (910 m) runway was a 1944 Douglas DC-3 that had originally been owned and operated by the Wrigley family.

== Catalina Island Conservancy ==
The airport is now owned by the Catalina Island Conservancy, which permits air charter aircraft to fly into the airport.

== Amenities ==
Located in the airport are publicly accessible toilet facilities and a restaurant and gift shop called DC3 Gifts and Grill.

== Operation ==
Runway 4/22 is a tabletop runway. The runway extends nearly to the edges of the flattened area, allowing no overrun protection. The first 1800 feet of Runway 22 slopes uphill toward the southwest, with the remainder being level or slightly downhill. The result is that aircraft on short final for Runway 22 only see the first part of the runway, the remainder only becoming visible as the airplane approaches the crest. This has resulted in accidents and blown tires as pilots thought they were about to go off the end of the runway. In strong southwest winds there can be a strong downdraft at the approach end of Runway 22. As a result of these factors, many aircraft rental agencies require a "Catalina checkout" with one of their instructors. Pilot caution is recommended.

In January 1984, a private Learjet overshot Runway 22, killing six people. After that, the Catalina Island Conservancy limited the types of aircraft allowed to use the airport.

On October 9, 2024, five people were killed as a twin-engine Beechcraft 95 crashed shortly after takeoff. The crash occurred just after 8pm, more than three hours after the closing time of the unlit airport.

== Gallery ==
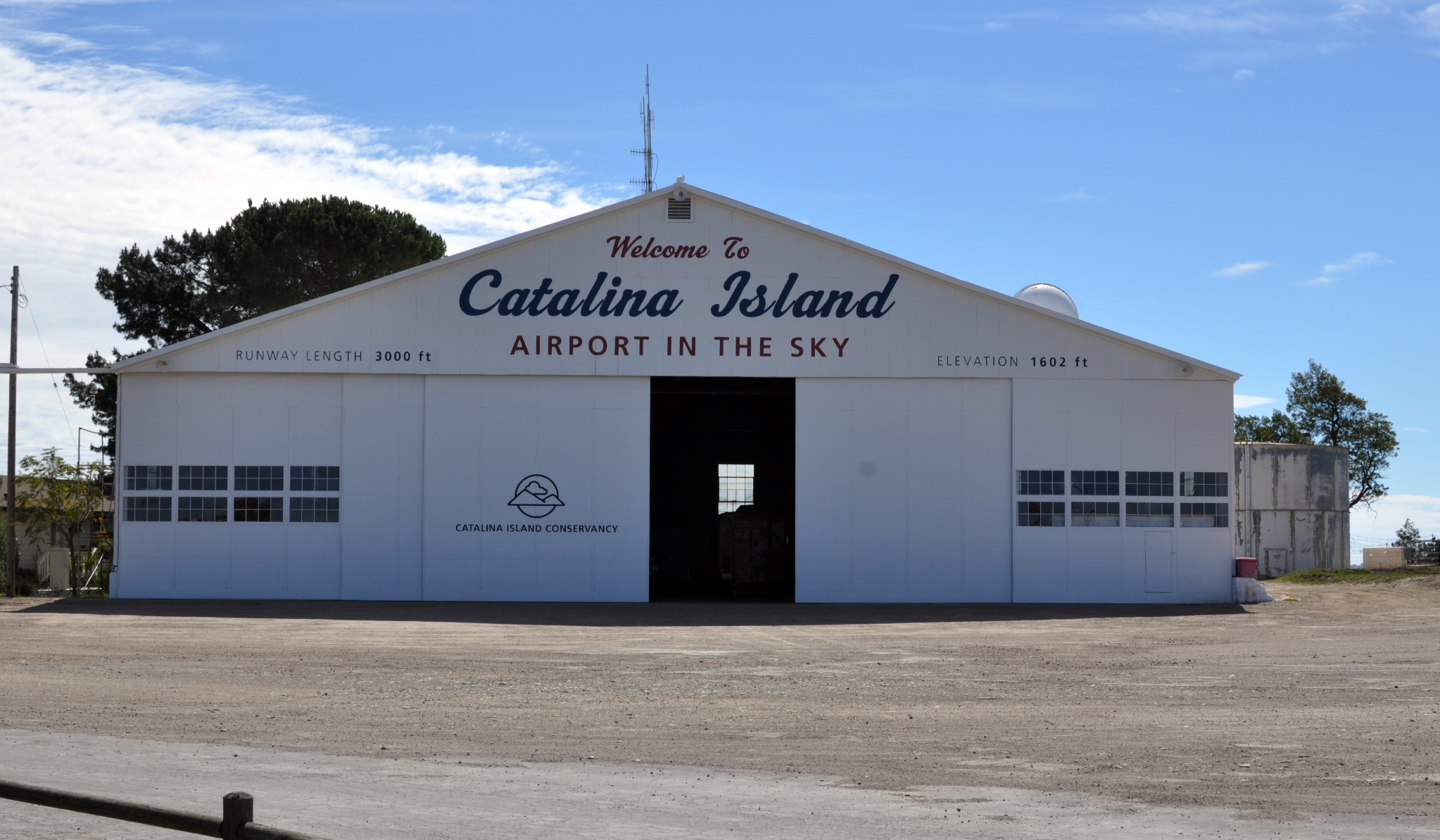
Catalina Airport's DC-3 hangar

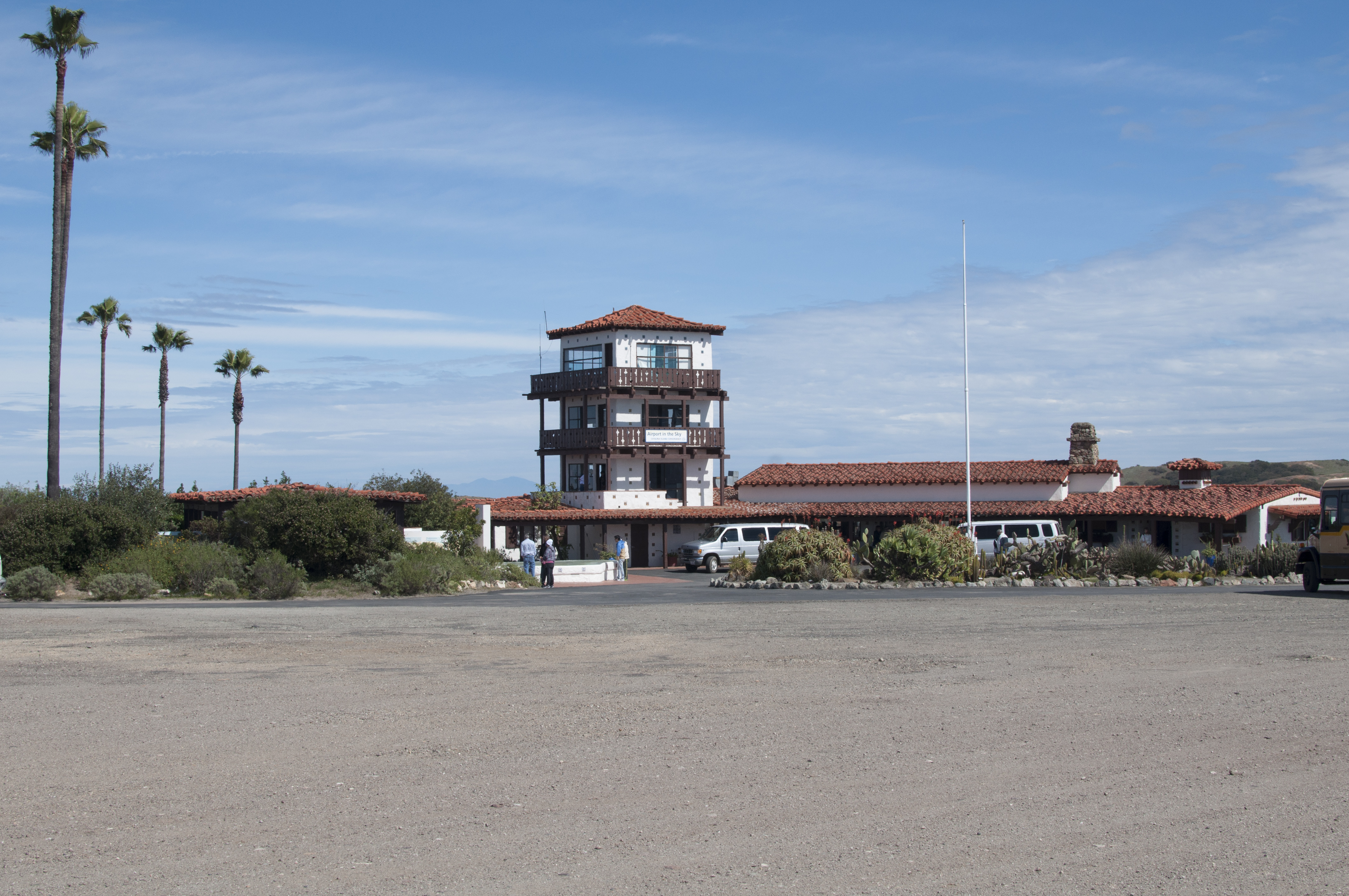
The tower in 2013

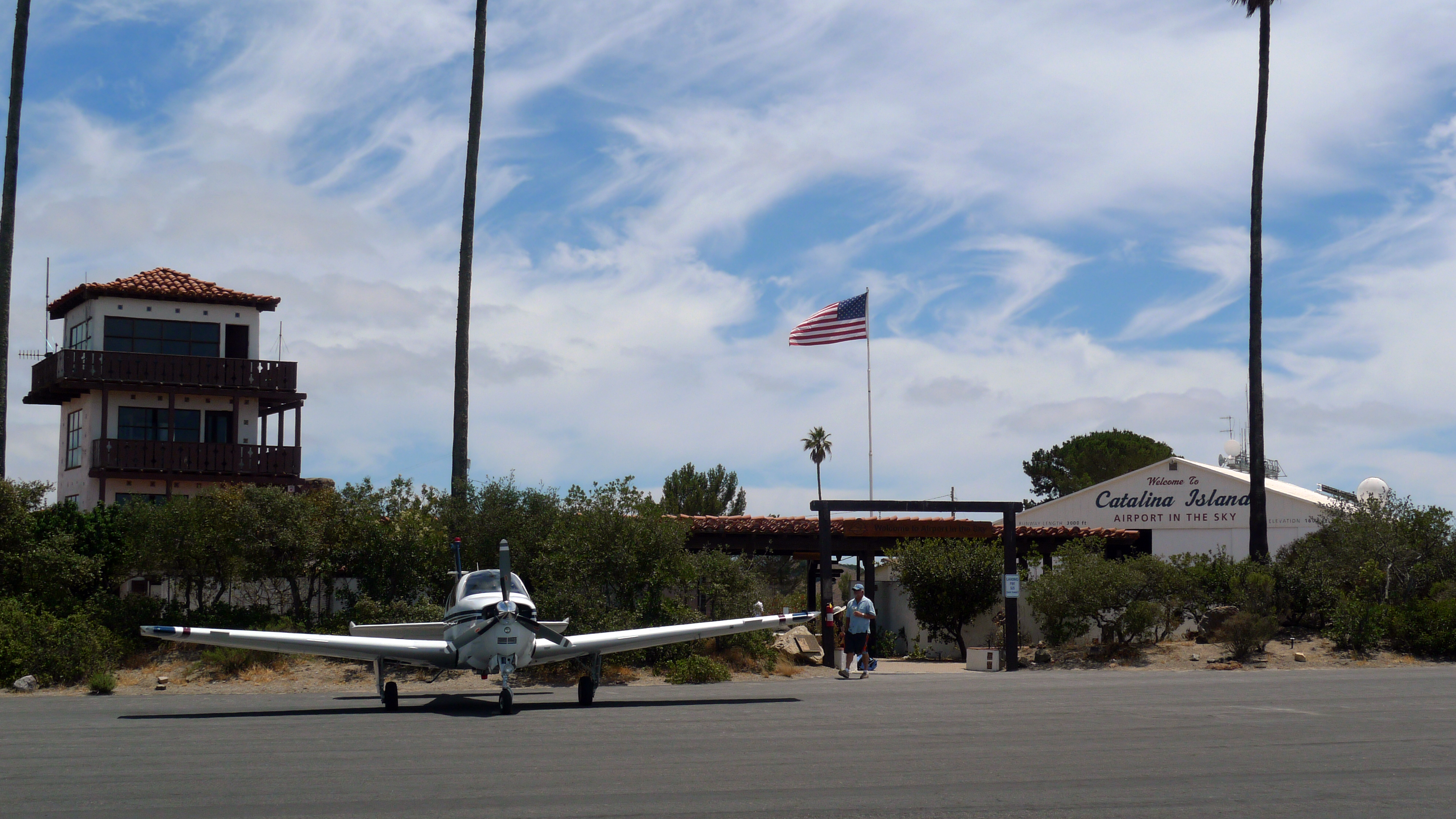
Catalina Airport from the runway

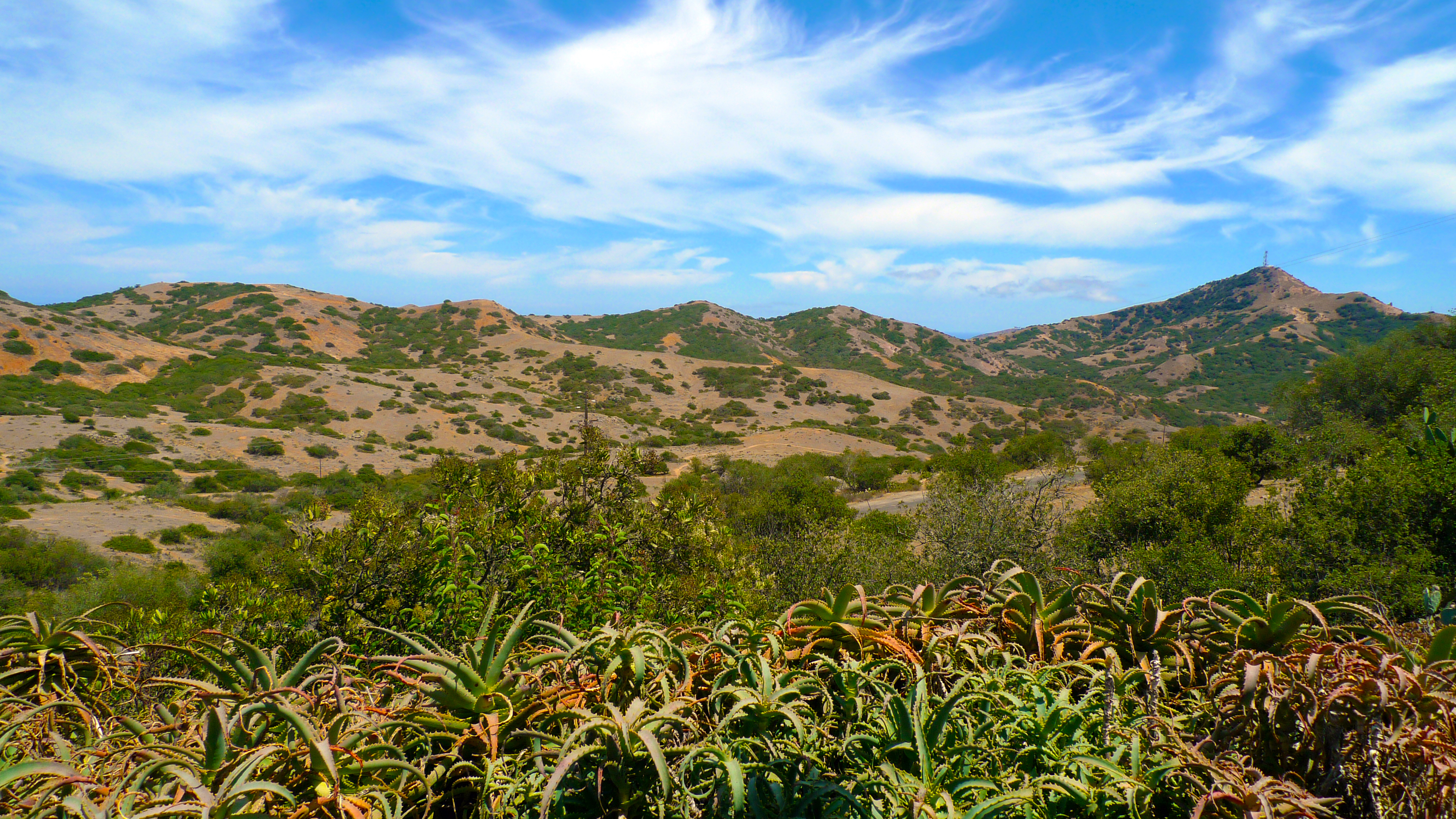
Catalina Island interior

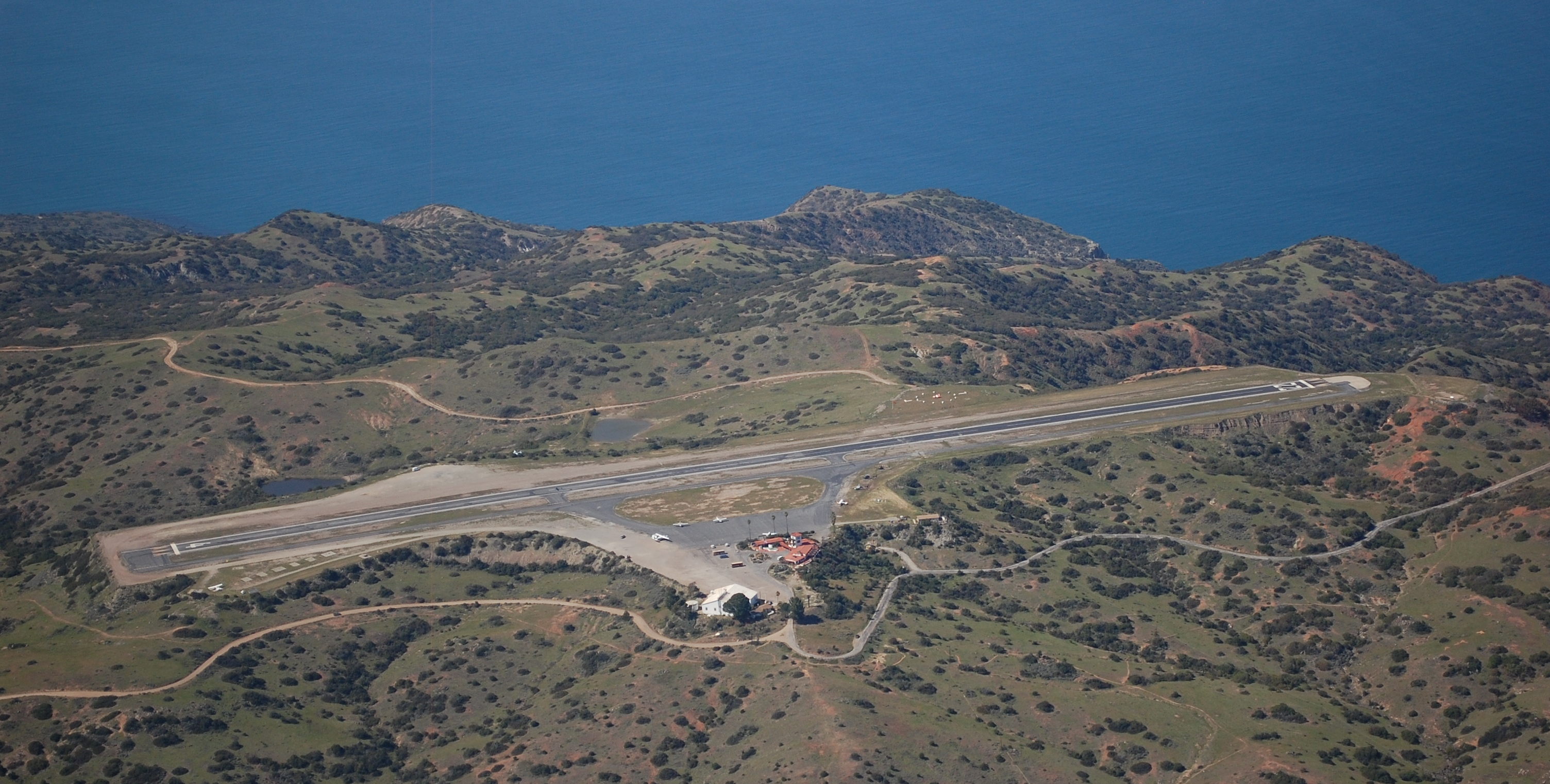
Airport aerial view from the East

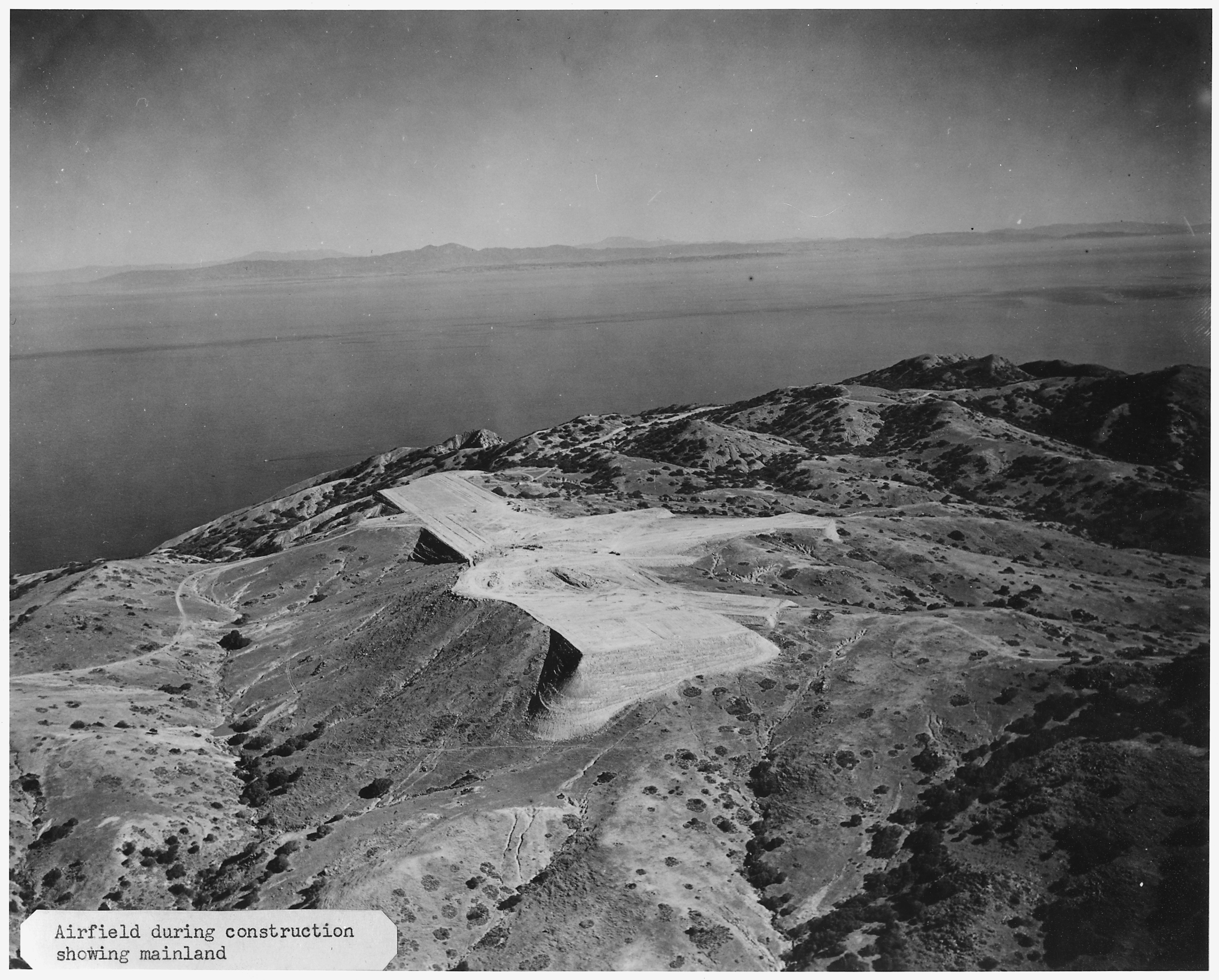
Aerial view during construction
