= Schine =

Schine may refer to:

- Cathleen Schine (born 1953), American author
- Gerard David Schine (1927–1996), central figure in the Army-McCarthy Hearings of 1954
- Junius Myer Schine (1890–1971), theater owner and father of Gerard
- Hillevi Rombin Schine (1933–1996), Swedish national decathlon champion and wife of Gerard

== Other uses ==
- Schine State Theatre in Sandusky, Ohio
- Schine's Holland Theatre in Bellefontaine, Ohio
- Schine's Auburn Theatre in Auburn, New York

== See also ==
- Shine (disambiguation)
