= Catalina Casino =

Entertainment facility in California, US

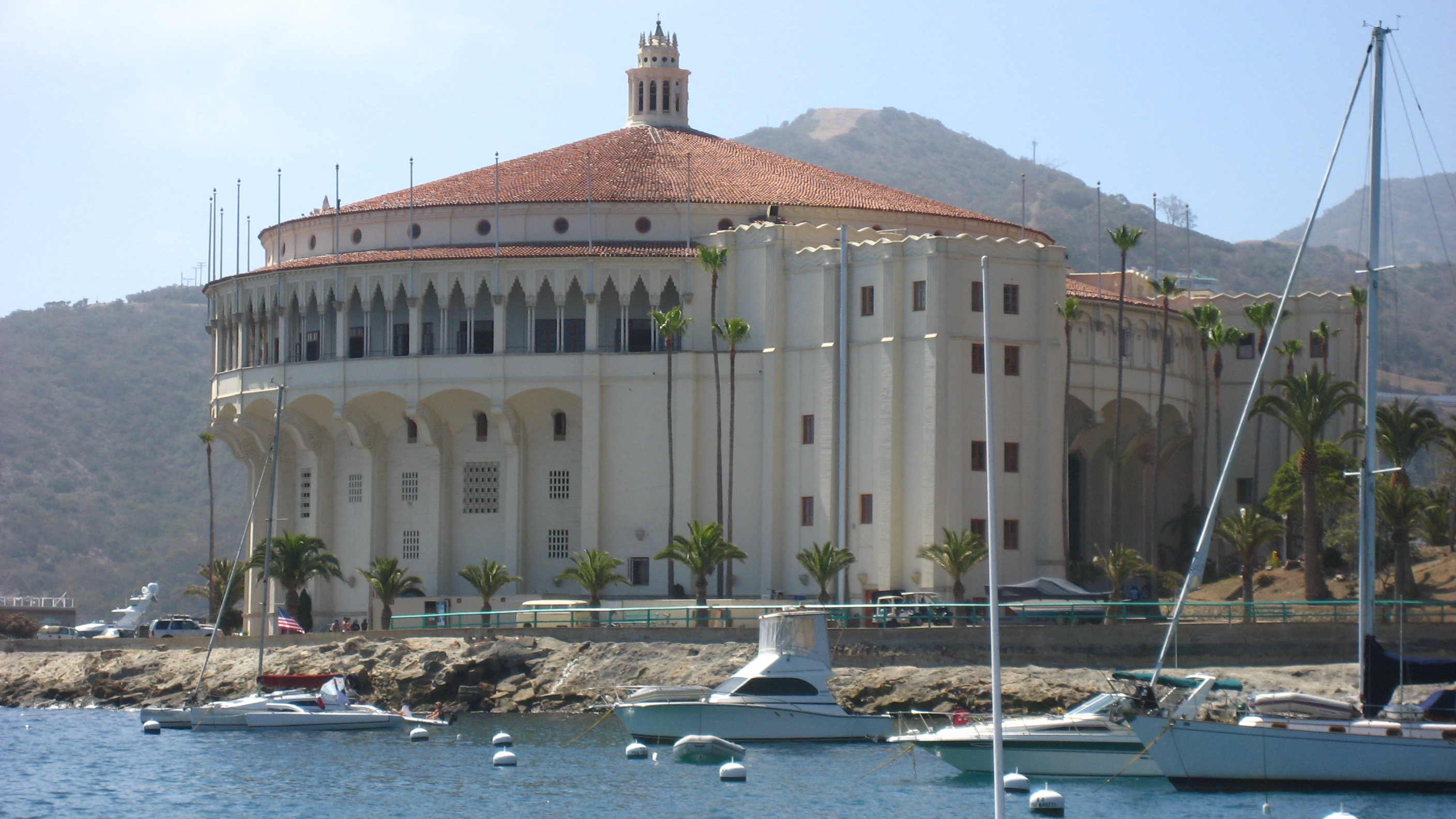
- Catalina Casino, from outside Avalon Harbor
- Interactive map of the Catalina Casino area

General information
- Type: Ballroom and movie theater
- Architectural style: Art Deco, Mediterranean Revival
- Location: Avalon, Santa Catalina Island, California, United States
- Coordinates: 33.34887°N 118.32601°W
- Construction started: February 1928
- Opened: May 29, 1929
- Cost: $2 million
- Owner: Santa Catalina Island Company

Technical details
- Structural system: round, cantilevered reinforced concrete column

Design and construction
- Architects: Walter Webber and Sumner Spaulding

The Catalina Casino is an entertainment facility in Avalon on Santa Catalina Island, off the coast of Los Angeles in California, US. It is the largest building on the island and the most visible landmark in Avalon Bay when approaching the island from the mainland.

The large building contains a movie theater, ballroom, and formerly an island art and history museum. The Catalina Casino gets its name from the Spanish term casino, meaning a "gathering place" or establishment used for social interactions and sometimes shows and dances. Contrary to the common English usage of the word casino, this has never been a facility for gambling.

== History ==
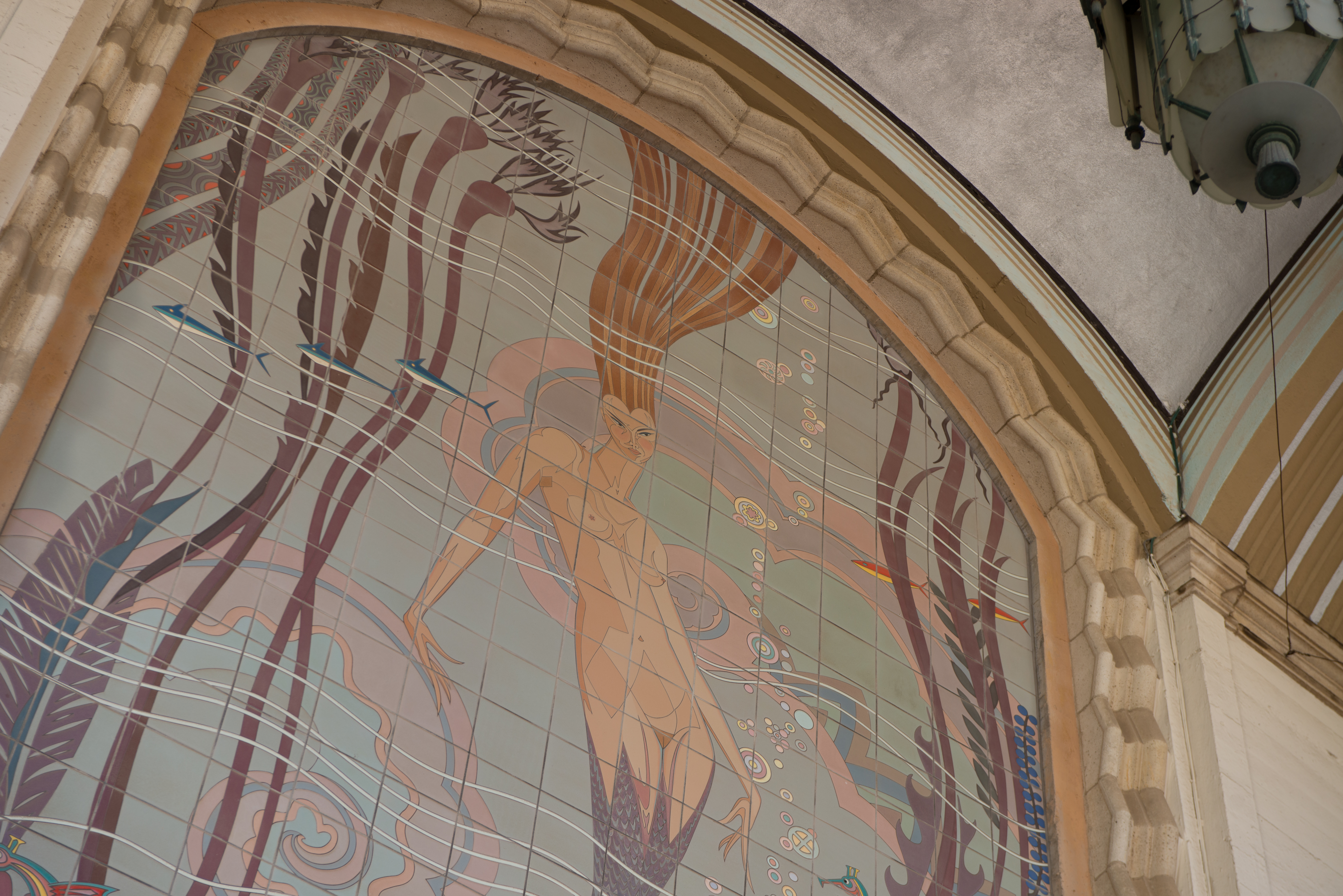
Tile work decorating the building's entrance

The Catalina Casino was built on a site formerly known as Sugarloaf Point. The site was graded for the planned construction of the Hotel St. Catherine, which was instead eventually built in Descanso Canyon. When chewing gum magnate William Wrigley Jr. bought the controlling stake in Catalina Island in 1919, he used this cleared site to build a dance hall he named Sugarloaf Casino. It served as a ballroom and Avalon's first high school, until it became too small for Avalon's growing population. In 1928, the Sugarloaf was razed to make room for a newer casino building. Sugarloaf Rock was further blasted away to enhance the Casino's ocean view.

On May 29, 1929, the new Catalina Casino was completed under the direction of Wrigley and David M. Renton, at a cost of $2 million. Its design, by Sumner Spaulding and Walter Webber, is in the Art Deco and Mediterranean Revival styles. The casino's movie theater was the first to be designed specifically for films with sound ("talkies"). It received the Honor Award from the California Chapter of the American Institute of Architects, as "one of the outstanding architectural accomplishments".

With a height equal to a 12-story building, it was built to serve as a theater on the main floor and a ballroom and promenade on the upper level. Movie studio moguls, such as Cecil B. DeMille, Louis B. Mayer, and Samuel Goldwyn, frequently came by yacht to the Casino to preview their newest cinema productions. It also serves as the island's civil defense shelter, large enough to accommodate Catalina's entire year-round population. Within its walls is stored enough food and water for all Avalon's residents for two weeks.

The steel structure of the predecessor Sugarloaf Casino can still be found in Avalon's abandoned bird park. The bird park was conceived by Mrs. Wrigley in the 1930s, and at the time it was one of the largest aviaries in the world.

In 1993, the movie theater was photographed by Hiroshi Sugimoto for his art series "Theatres".

In 1994, the theater underwent a $750,000 restoration that reupholstered all of its seats and cleaned its murals.

In September 2008, the Catalina Casino had the first live full production of a musical on its stage, when the Santa Catalina Island Company presented Grease!.

In December 2019, The Catalina Island Company stopped screening first run showings of movies, essentially ceasing its function as a traditional film venue. They cite the rise of streaming services and large use of satellite television in the small town of 4000 as contributing factors to the theater's low attendance. The theater remains available for daily tours and special events such as the Catalina Film Festival and Silent Film Benefit.

== Structure ==
Surrounded by sea on three sides, the circular structure of the Catalina Casino is the equivalent of 12 stories tall. It has a movie theater on the first level and a ballroom on the top level. The building interiors were decorated in the Art Deco style, including with sterling silver and gold-leaf accents.

=== Movie theater ===
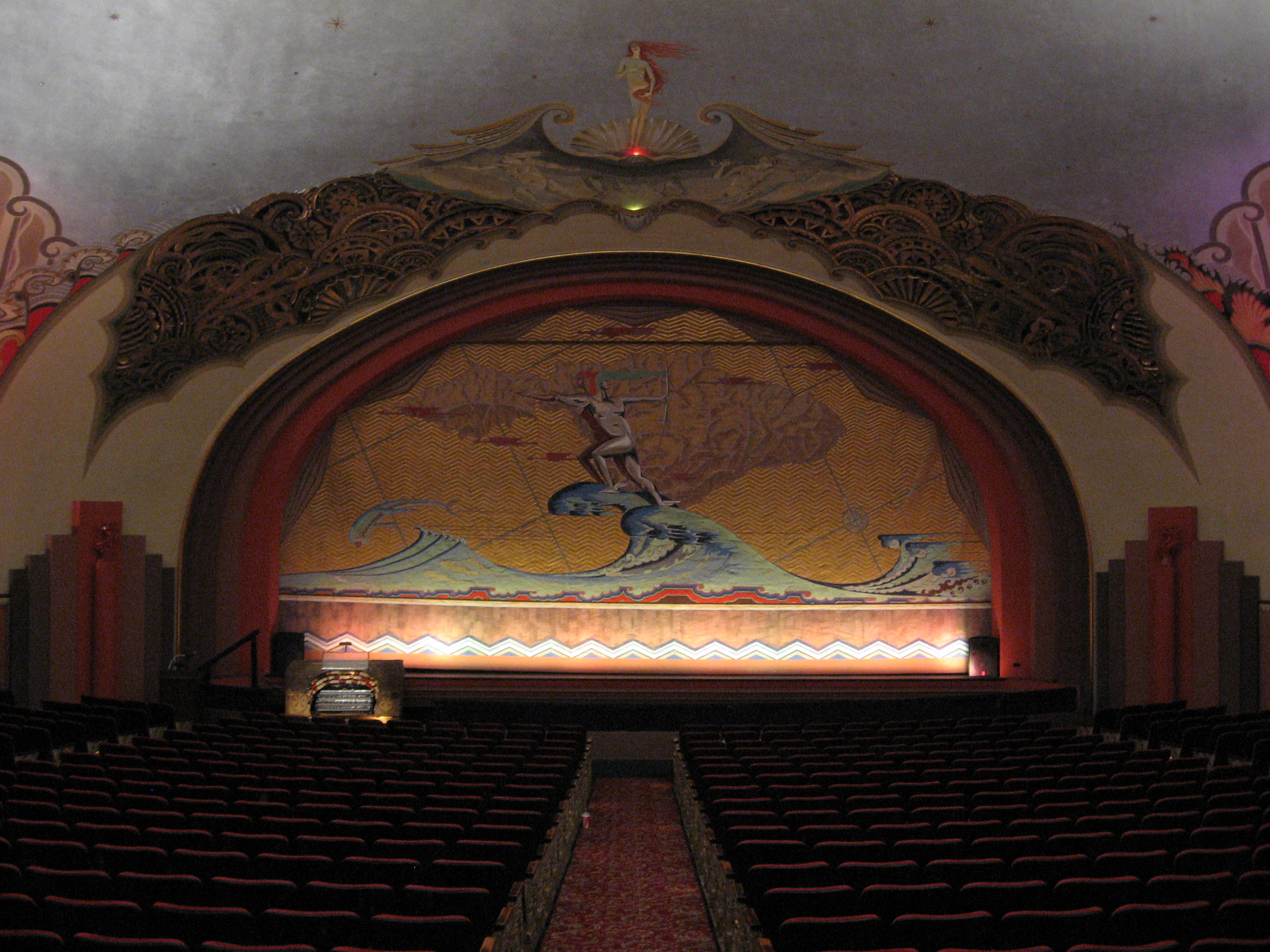
Avalon Theatre's stage

The Avalon Theatre is a movie theater on the first level, with a seating capacity of 1,154. It has a single massive screen. The theater has its original 4-manual, 16 rank pipe organ built by the Page Organ Company of Lima, Ohio.

The theater is sound insulated so that patrons do not hear the band or up to 3,000 dancers in the ballroom above. The circular domed ceiling has notable acoustics and has been studied by acoustical designers, due to its repute. A speaker on the theater stage can speak in a normal voice without a microphone and be heard clearly by all in attendance.

The theater's interior walls retain the original Art Deco murals by John Gabriel Beckman. The theater's entrance loggia, located between the two wings housing the ramps, feature nine mural panels of an Art Deco-style underwater world scene. In 1986, the center mural, depicting a mermaid, was restored using hand-painted tiles as originally envisioned. The restoration was with replications of Beckman's design created in Catalina Pottery-style tiles. The lobby has walnut wood paneling.

=== Ballroom ===
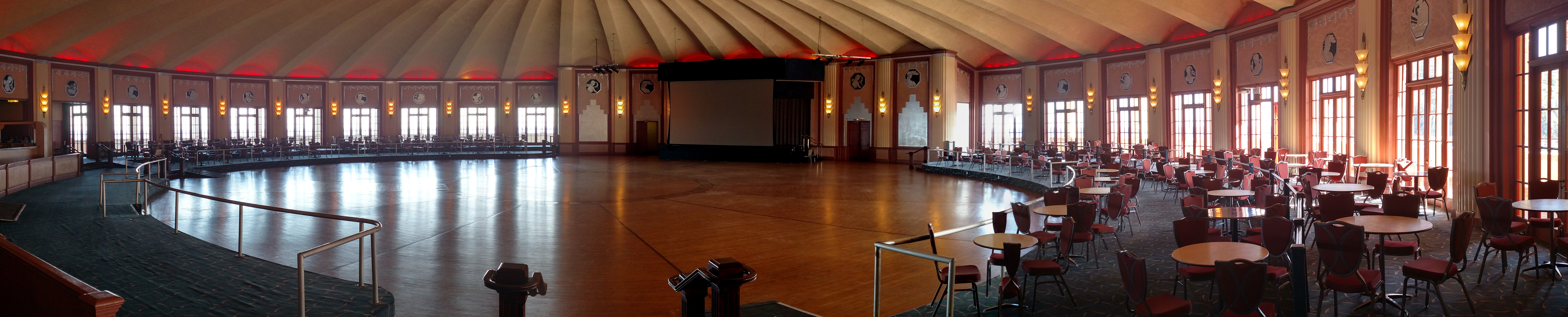
Ballroom

The upper-level houses the 20,000-square-foot Catalina Casino Ballroom. It is the world's largest circular ballroom, with a 180-foot (55 m) diameter dance floor that can accommodate 3,000 dancers. French doors encircle the room connecting the dance floor with the Romance Promenade, an open balcony that runs around the building.

To reach the ballroom on the top level, the Casino building has two ramped walkways, both in enclosed towers that extend out from the circular building. Wrigley took the idea to use ramps instead of stairs from Wrigley Field, his Chicago Cubs stadium. The ramps allowed the large numbers of people using the ballroom to quickly move to and from their destinations. They each have a small lobby area just below the dance floor level.

== Catalina Island Museum ==
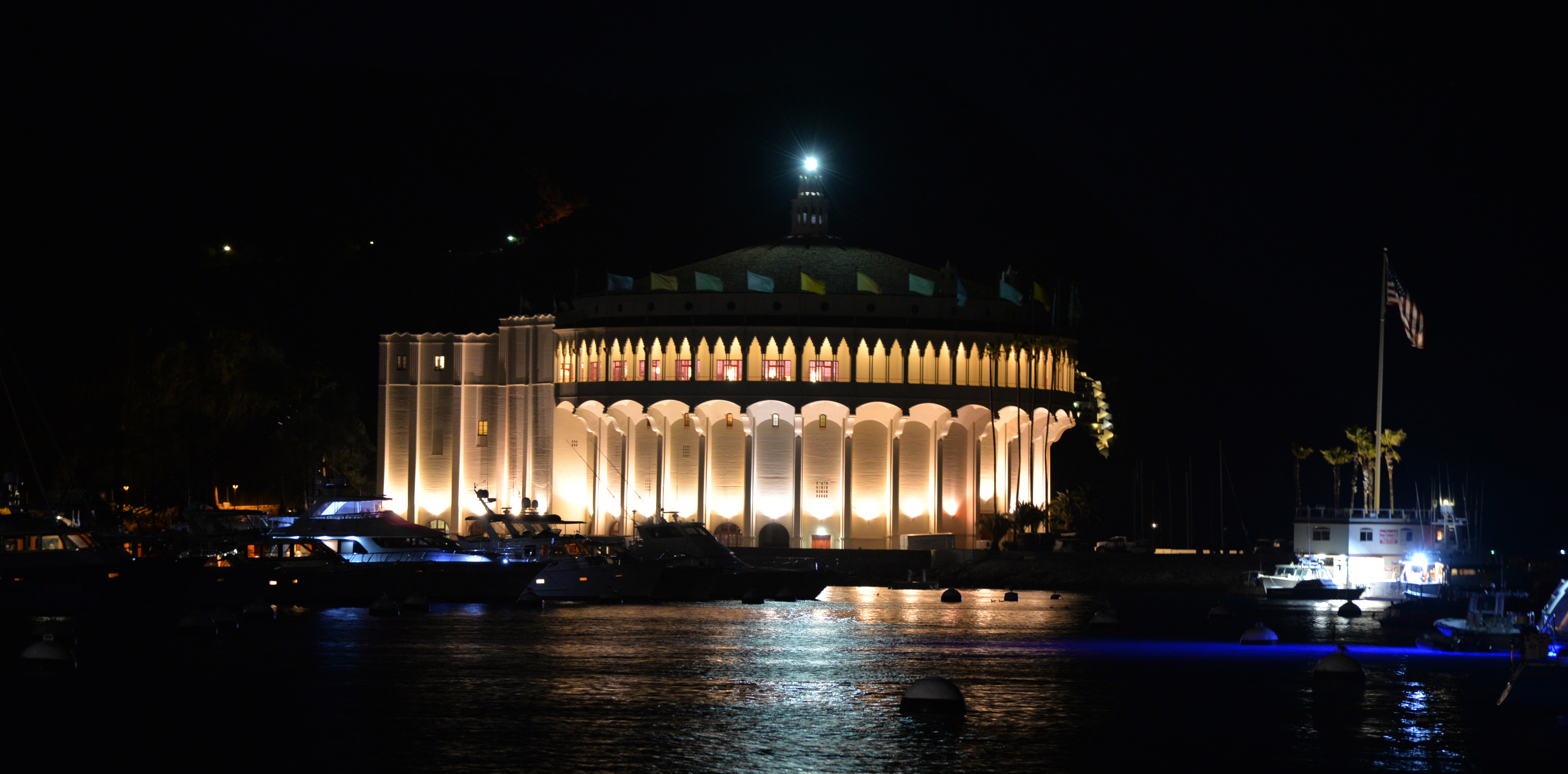
View from the harbor at night

In 1953, Philip K. Wrigley established the Catalina Island Museum on the first level, to preserve the history of the island from the pre-Columbian indigenous Tongva (Gabrielino) peoples through the pre-war 20th-century development by his father. The museum featured a large and comprehensive collection of original Catalina Pottery ceramics, produced by Catalina Clay Products between 1927 and 1937.

On June 18, 2016, the museum relocated to a new building, located approximately one half mile from its original location in the Catalina Casino. The Ada Blanche Wrigley Schreiner Building is located at 217 Metropole Avenue.

The museum continues documenting Catalina Island history, adding from World War II to the present day, and a research institute. It is the repository for all archeological digs on the island, and has one of the largest collections of Tongva artifacts in the world. There are now more than 10,000 photographs and negatives documenting island life from the early 1880s until the present day in the museum's photography collection.

== In popular culture ==
- The Casino figures in the 1935 film Murder on a Honeymoon.
- A portion of the 1974 film Chinatown was filmed on Catalina Island, featuring cinematic shots of the Casino.
- In 1984, Catalina Island and the Casino were filming locations for the Airwolf episode "Sins of the Past". A replica of the Casino was set ablaze in the episode.
- After players complete the 2020 action-adventure video game The Last of Us Part II, the main menu screen changes to a beachfront with a rowboat in the foreground and the Casino in the background, implying that Abby has finally reached the Casino to reunite with her former group.
- The theater is featured in Episode 12005 of California's Gold with Huell Howser.
