= Catalina Pottery =

US pottery maker

Catalina Clay Products
- Industry: Ceramic manufacturing
- Founded: 1927
- Defunct: 1937
- Successor: Gladding, McBean & Company
- Headquarters: Santa Catalina Island, California, United States
- Key people: William Wrigley Jr.
- Products: Ceramic art ware, dinnerware, and tile
- Parent: Santa Catalina Island Company

Catalina Pottery (or Catalina Island Pottery) is the commonly used name for Catalina Clay Products, a division of the Santa Catalina Island Company, which produced brick, tile, tableware and decorative pottery on Santa Catalina Island, California. Catalina Clay Products was founded in 1927. Gladding, McBean & Co. acquired all of the assets of the company in 1937 and moved all production to its Franciscan dinnerware division in Los Angeles.

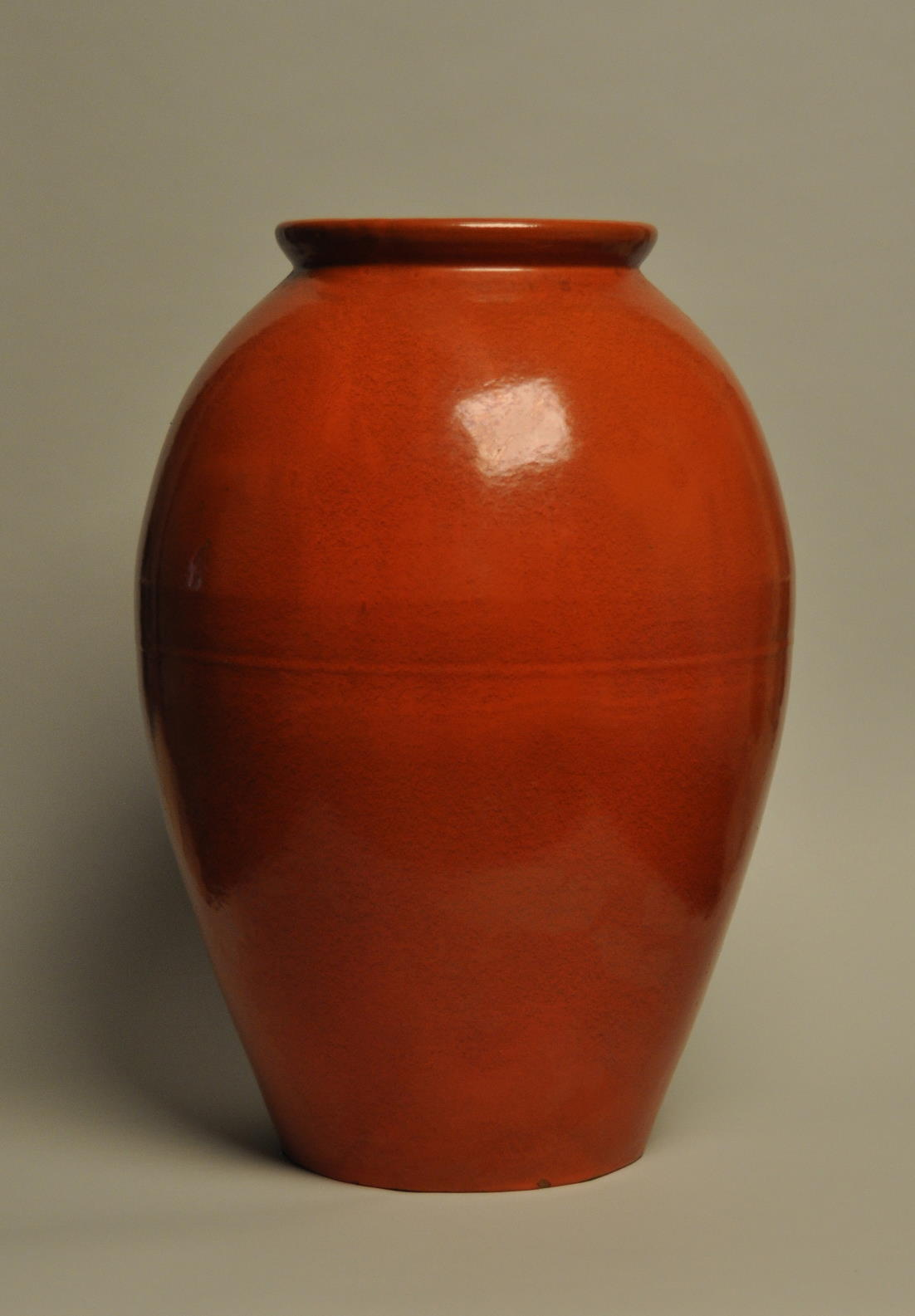
Catalina Pottery oil jar

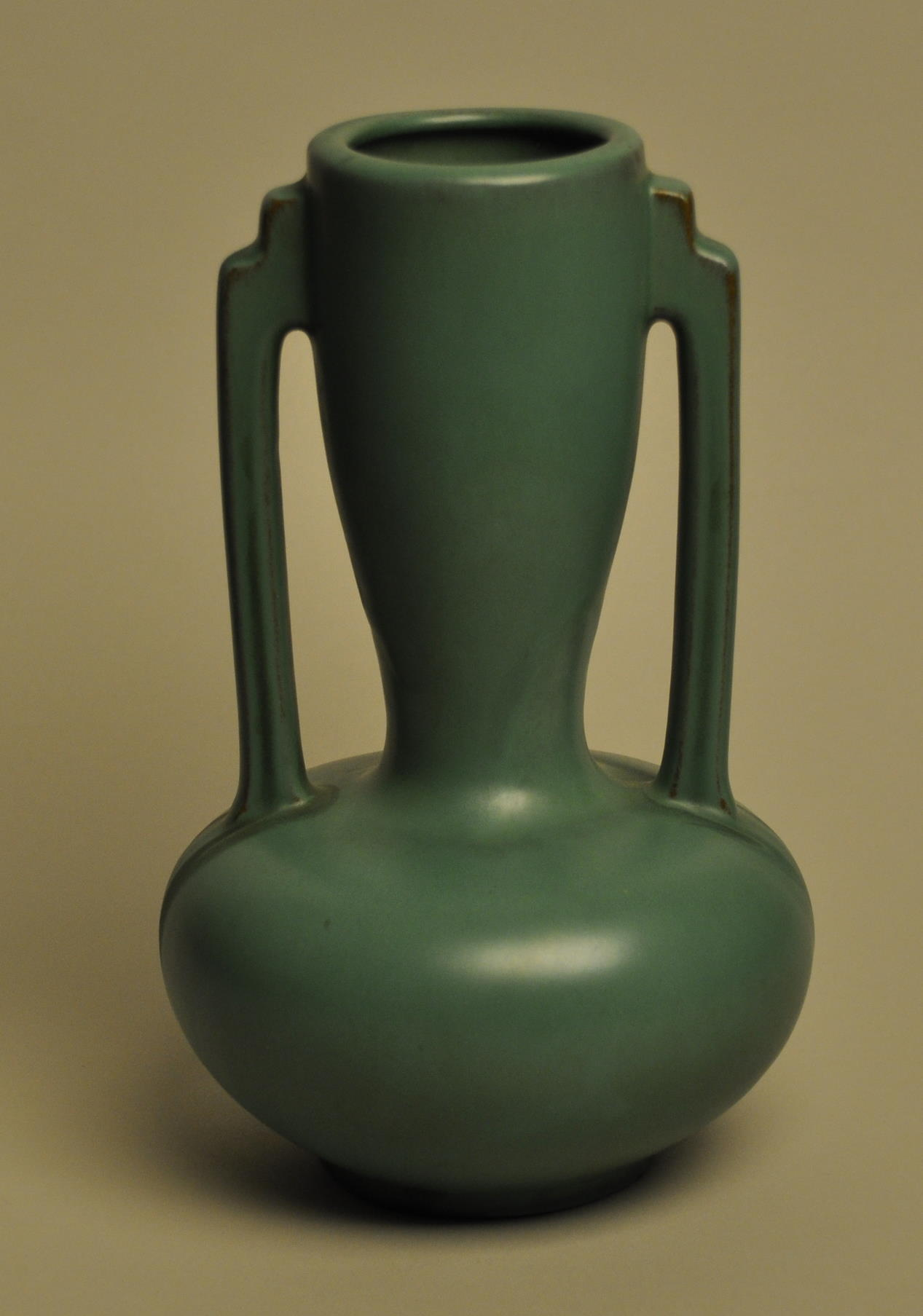
Catalina Pottery vase

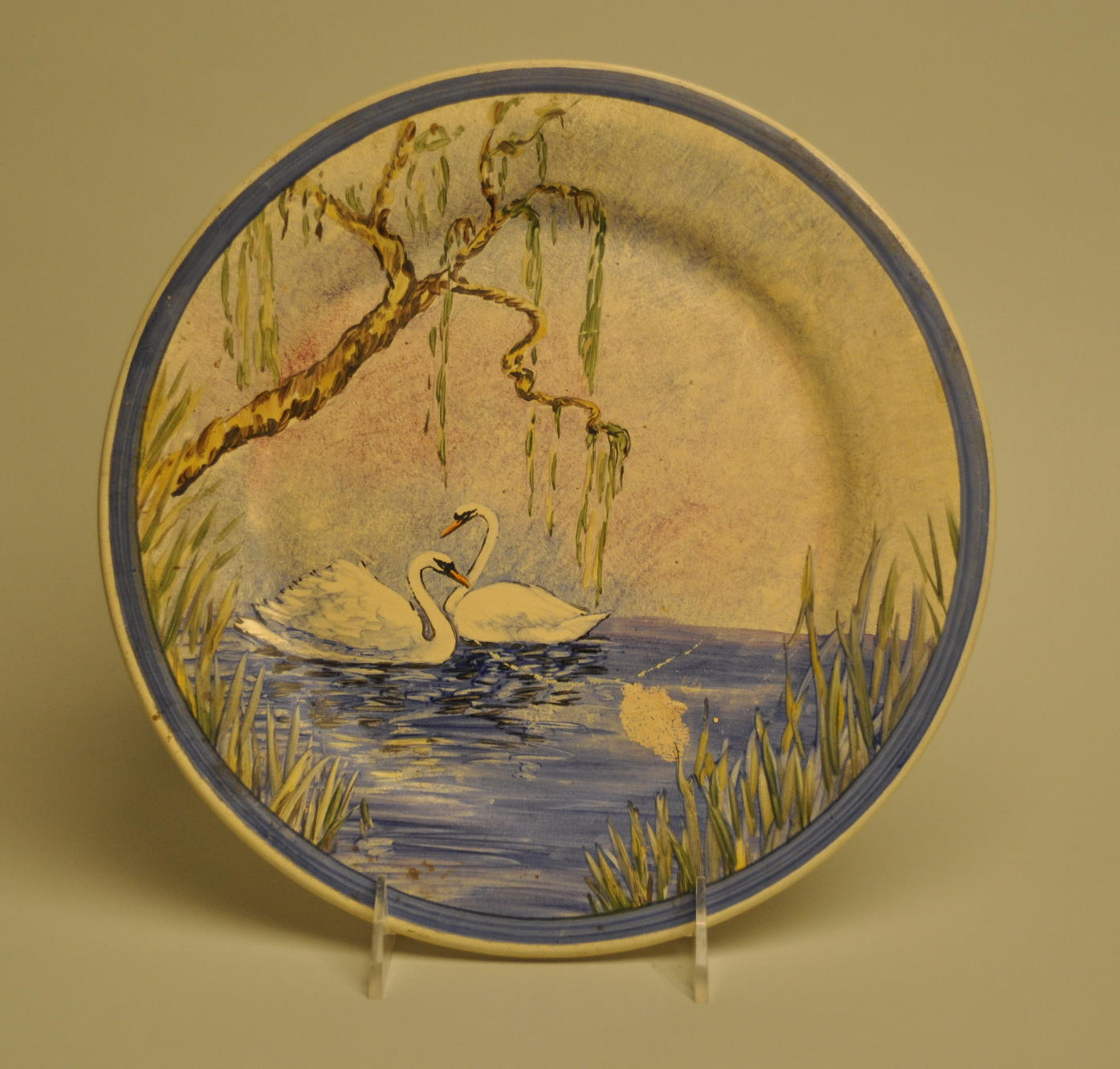
Catalina Pottery painted plate

== History ==
In 1927, William Wrigley Jr. built a tile and brick pottery on a beach located near Avalon, Santa Catalina Island. The new pottery became Catalina Clay Products, a division of Wrigley's Santa Catalina Island Company. See:David Malcolm Renton. The pottery used local clays from the Island. This business venture had two purposes: to produce clay building products and to provide the much needed year-round employment for Island residents.

In 1930, Wrigley brought artisans to the Island to design decorative and functional pottery products including souvenirs, vases, bookends and figurines. Red clays found on the Island were used for pottery until 1931. After 1931 white clay from the United States mainland was combined with the red clay until finally only white clay was used. Glazes were made with local minerals mined on the Island. The company sold its ware as Catalina Pottery and Catalina Tile. The pottery opened free standing stores to sell their wares in Avalon, Santa Catalina Island, Hollywood, Olvera Street in Los Angeles, and in the Arizona Biltmore Hotel, Phoenix. Dinnerware and art ware was sold through department and jewelry stores. The pottery's tile was used for the interiors and exteriors of buildings on the Island. Tile products were used throughout the United States. The Arizona Biltmore Hotel's swimming pool was built using Catalina tile.

In 1937, Catalina Clay Products, including all equipment, stock, molds, and trademarks, were sold to Gladding, McBean & Co. The pottery on the Island was closed. "The Santa Catalina Island Company initially suggested that Gladding McBean lease the production facilities at Pebbly Beach and continue to produce the Catalina Pottery on the island. This proposal did not interest the mainland firm because the high cost of importing clay had caused the problem in the first place." All molds and equipment were moved to Gladding, McBean & Co.'s Glendale plant in Los Angeles. Gladding, McBean continued to produce Catalina art ware and dinnerware shapes for their Catalina Pottery art ware lines until 1942. Gladding, McBean & Co.'s Catalina Pottery art ware was marked Catalina Pottery, made in USA, with an ink stamp. All tile products were discontinued.

Max Weil of California, formerly The California Figurine Co. purchased the Catalina art ware molds and patterns from Gladding McBean and Co., however Gladding, McBean & Co. retained the trade name Catalina. In 1947, Gladding, McBean & Co. returned the use of the trademark to the Santa Catalina Island Company.
