= John Gabriel Beckman =

American art director

John Gabriel Beckman (March 27, 1898 – October 25, 1989) was an American set designer, art director, and production designer. He was inducted into the Art Directors Guild Hall of Fame posthumously in 2014.

== Early life and education ==
John Gabriel Beckman was born on March 27, 1898, in Astoria, Oregon, the eldest of three children. His parents, Oswald and Johanna Maria (née Pernu), were of Finnish descent. For some of his childhood, Beckman lived in Sointula, British Columbia, then his family moved to San Francisco in 1905. John, his mother, and his siblings were visiting Fort Bragg when the 1906 San Francisco earthquake struck, and it was two weeks before they learned that their father, who had remained in San Francisco, had survived. The family relocated to Fort Bragg.

In 1910, Beckman studied in Europe and Russia, returning to the United States in 1912 when his mother became ill. Beckman was booked to sail home on RMS Titanic, but instead took earlier passage on RMS Olympic. He graduated from Fort Bragg Union High School in 1915.

He attended University of California, Berkeley but did not graduate.

== Career ==
After serving in the Army Air Corps in the U.S. during World War I, Beckman began working in a shipyard. He also had jobs at the Hercules Powder Company and Spreckles Sugar Company. Beckman then worked for an architect in Sacramento for a year before heading to Los Angeles in 1920. He joined the firm of Walker & Eisen, then contributed to the design of Grauman's Egyptian Theatre as part of the architecture firm Meyer & Holler. Beckman was the head of the design team for Grauman's Chinese Theatre and painted the murals throughout the lobby area.

Beckman struck out on his own in 1928. Some of his decorating work during this period included several stores and houses, murals for the Christian Science Church in Glendale, and interior decoration for Aimee Semple McPherson. During the Great Depression, Beckman and fellow artists Emil Kosa Jr. and Sam Johnson painted miniatures for Bullocks Wilshire.

Beckman took a commission to design and paint the murals for the Catalina Casino from William Wrigley Jr. in 1928. He designed nine panels of underwater life for the exterior which were painted in fresco. The interior murals were painted on heavy material made of jute. Beckman's designs for the murals have been described as futuristic, Art Deco, and Art Nouveau. Beckman attended the 60th anniversary party for the Avalon Casino on Santa Catalina Island in 1989, several months before his death.

In 1934, Beckman started work in the film industry, apprenticing to Richard Day, and eventually became the art director at Warner Brothers Studio.

Beckman had a heart attack in 1962. For several years after, he painted prolifically and exhibited his paintings in a Los Angeles gallery. His paintings were exhibited after his death at The Sovereign Collection, Oregon History Center, from November 1995 to February 1996.

His first work in television was as art director for the series Profiles in Courage. Other credits include Nero Wolfe and The Partridge Family. Beckman was 88 years old when he was hired as the art director for Designing Women, on which he worked until his death.

== Movies ==
Some of the films that Beckman worked on include:

- Les Miserables (1934)
- The Life of Emile Zola (1937)
- Lost Horizon (1937)
- The Adventures of Robin Hood (1938)
- The Maltese Falcon (1941)
- Casablanca (1942)
- Arsenic and Old Lace (1944)
- Monsieur Verdoux (1947)
- The Glass Menagerie (1950)
- The Iron Mistress (1952)
- By the Light of the Silvery Moon (1953)
- Calamity Jane (1953)}
- Toward the Unknown (1956)
- Home Before Dark (1958)
- Wake Me When It's Over (1960)
- Gypsy (1962)

== Personal life ==
Beckman married Nellie Cahill in 1923. John Gabriel Beckman Jr. was born on May 12, 1927. Nellie died in December 1951. In 1952, Beckman married Layne Grey, and their daughter Jane was born on June 21, 1954.{ Layne died in February 1975.

Beckman died on October 25, 1989.
