= Embassy Theatre (Fort Wayne) =

Historic theater in Fort Wayne, Indiana, U.S.

- Emboyd Theatre
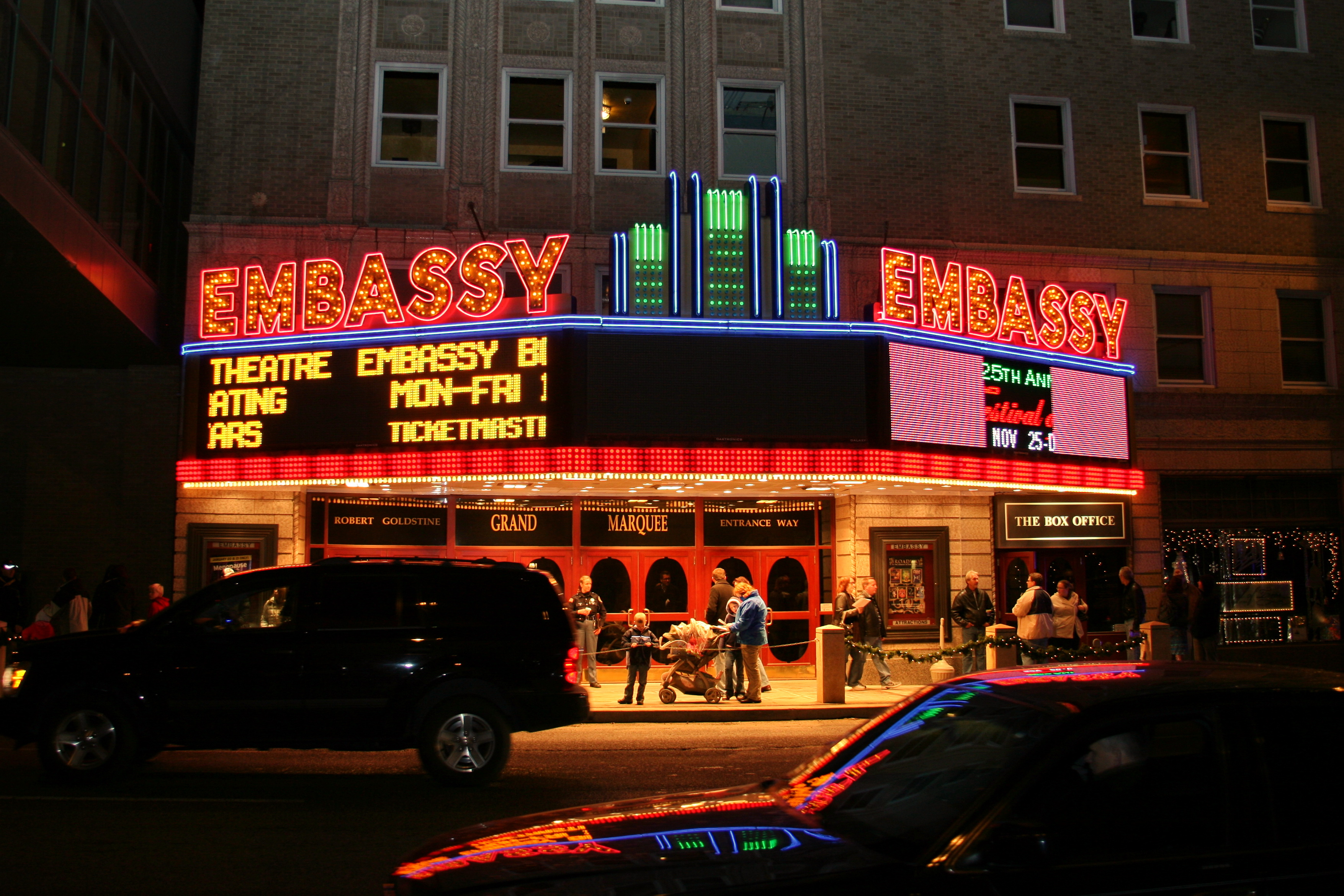
- Interactive map of Embassy Theatre
- Address: 125 West Jefferson Blvd; Fort Wayne, Indiana; United States
- Owner: Embassy Theatre Foundation
- Operator: Embassy Theatre Foundation
- Capacity: 2,471
- Type: movie palace and vaudeville house
- Screen: 1
- Current use: live event venue

Construction
- Opened: May 14, 1928

Website
- www.fwembassytheatre.org
- Embassy Theater and Indiana Hotel
- U.S. National Register of Historic Places
- Location within Indiana Location within the United States
- Coordinates: 41°4′32″N 85°8′24″W
- Built: 1926
- Architect: John Eberson
- NRHP reference No.: 75000041
- Added to NRHP: September 5, 1975

The Embassy Theatre (formerly the Emboyd Theatre) is a 2,471-seat performing arts theater in Fort Wayne, Indiana, USA. It was built in 1928 as a movie palace and up until recently, it was the home of the Fort Wayne Philharmonic.

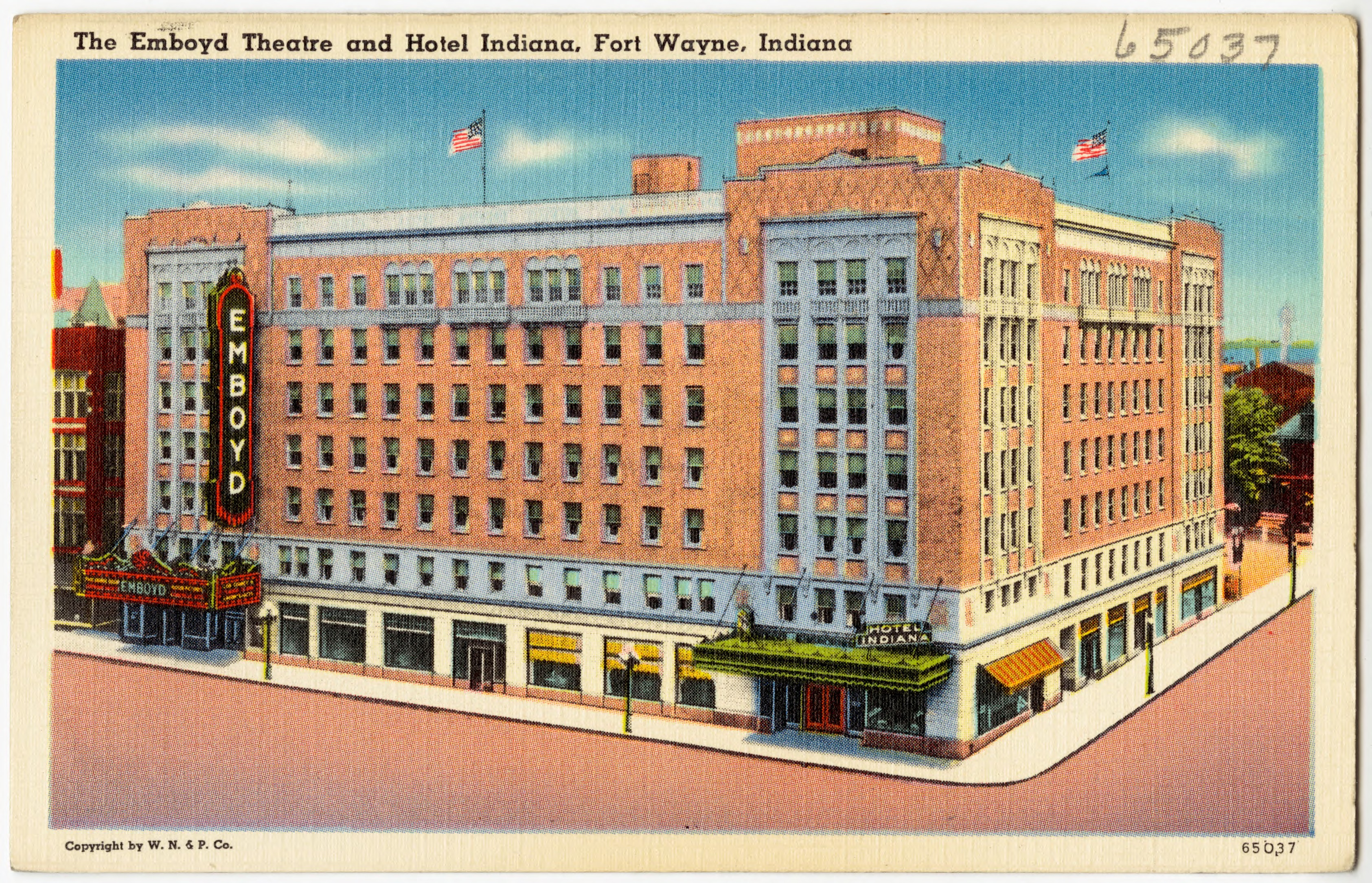
A postcard depicting the Emboyd and Indiana Hotel, circa 1930–1945.

== History ==
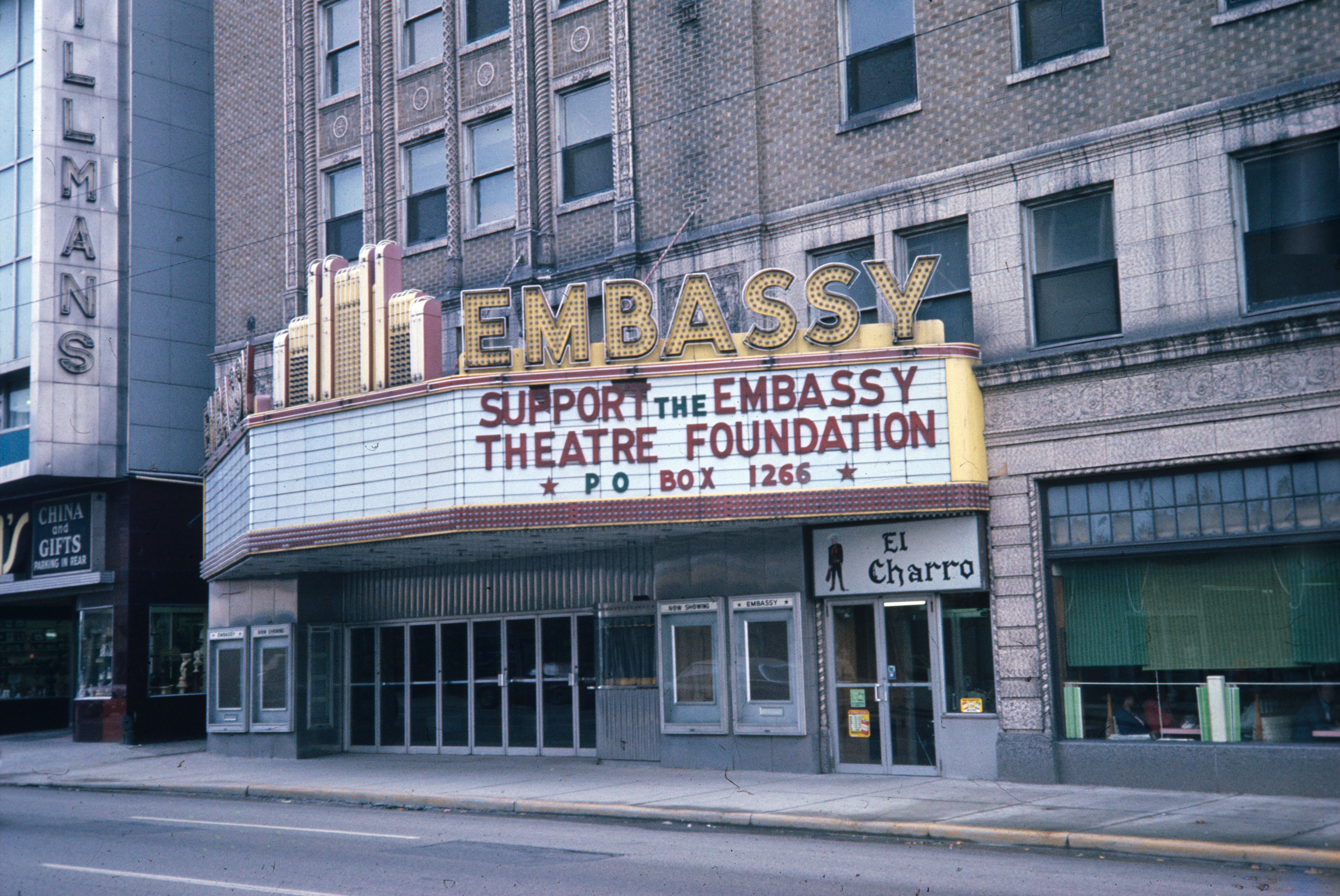
Embassy Theatre

The theatre has been known by its current name since 1952. Attached to the Embassy Theatre to the west is the seven-story Indiana Hotel. The theatre features a 1,100-pipe Page theater organ, which was restored between 1976 and 1996.

The Embassy was placed on the National Register of Historic Places in 1975, the year the theater was reopened as a performing arts center. Since its reopening, the theatre has primarily been used for concerts, Broadway shows, symphonies, family shows, and other events. The stage, which contains a red sequined velour main curtain, was expanded in 1995 to its current size of 44′7″ by 54 feet.

The Indiana Hotel lobby and mezzanine were also restored at this time. A new marquee was added to the front façade in 2005 as well as curbside improvements.

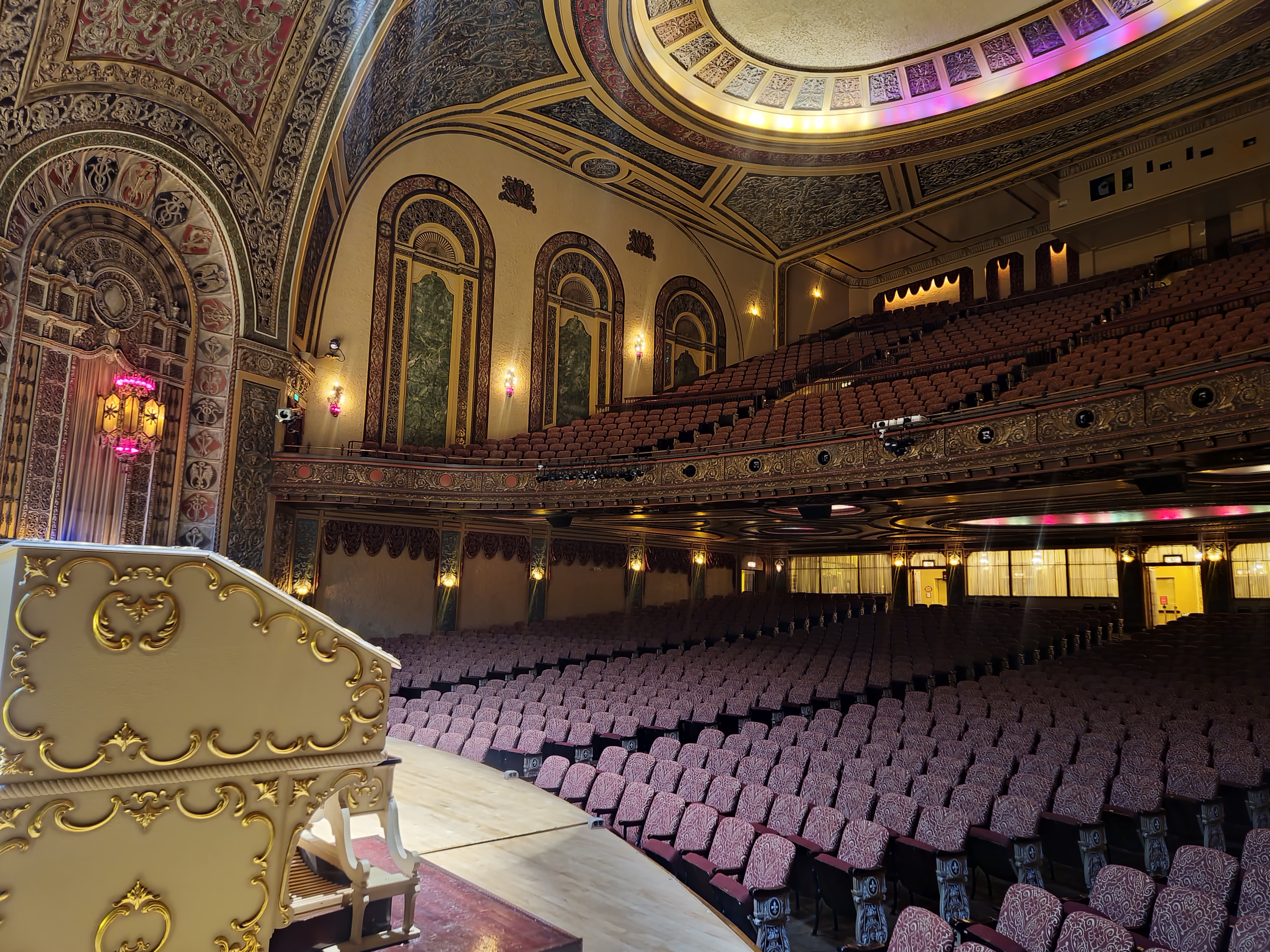
Embassy Theatre featuring the Grande Page Pipe Organ.

== See also ==
- National Register of Historic Places listings in Allen County, Indiana
- List of music venues in the United States
