= Taylor, Washington =

Ghost town in Washington (state)

- Ghost town
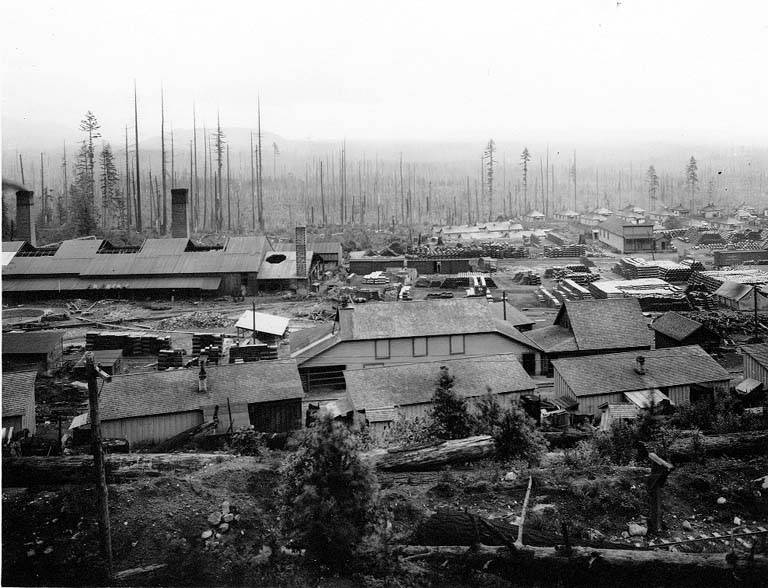
- Denny-Renton Clay and Coal Co. brick and tile plant, Taylor, Washington.

- Location within Washington (state) Location within the United States
- Coordinates: 47°25′08″N 121°54′20″W
- Country: United States
- State: Washington
- County: King
- Platted: 1893
- Time zone: UTC-8 (Pacific (PST))
  - Summer (DST): UTC-7 (PDT)

Taylor is a ghost town in King County, in the U.S. state of Washington.

== History ==
Taylor was laid out in 1893 as a company town by the Denny Clay Company after a railway was built in the area in 1892. The Denny Clay Company and its successors both mined clay and produced clay products in Taylor, which were then transported via rail. Coal was also mined in Taylor, which in turn could be used in the kilns used to fire the clay. Besides the mine, factory and housing, the town was also home to a hotel, saloon and a post office called Taylor was established in 1904 which remained in operation until 1944.

While one of the major clay items produced at Taylor was sewer pipes, it did not have a sophisticated sewage treatment system itself and the city of Seattle was concerned the waste water from town would pollute the city's water supply. This led to the city eventually condemning the town in 1947.

== Present day ==
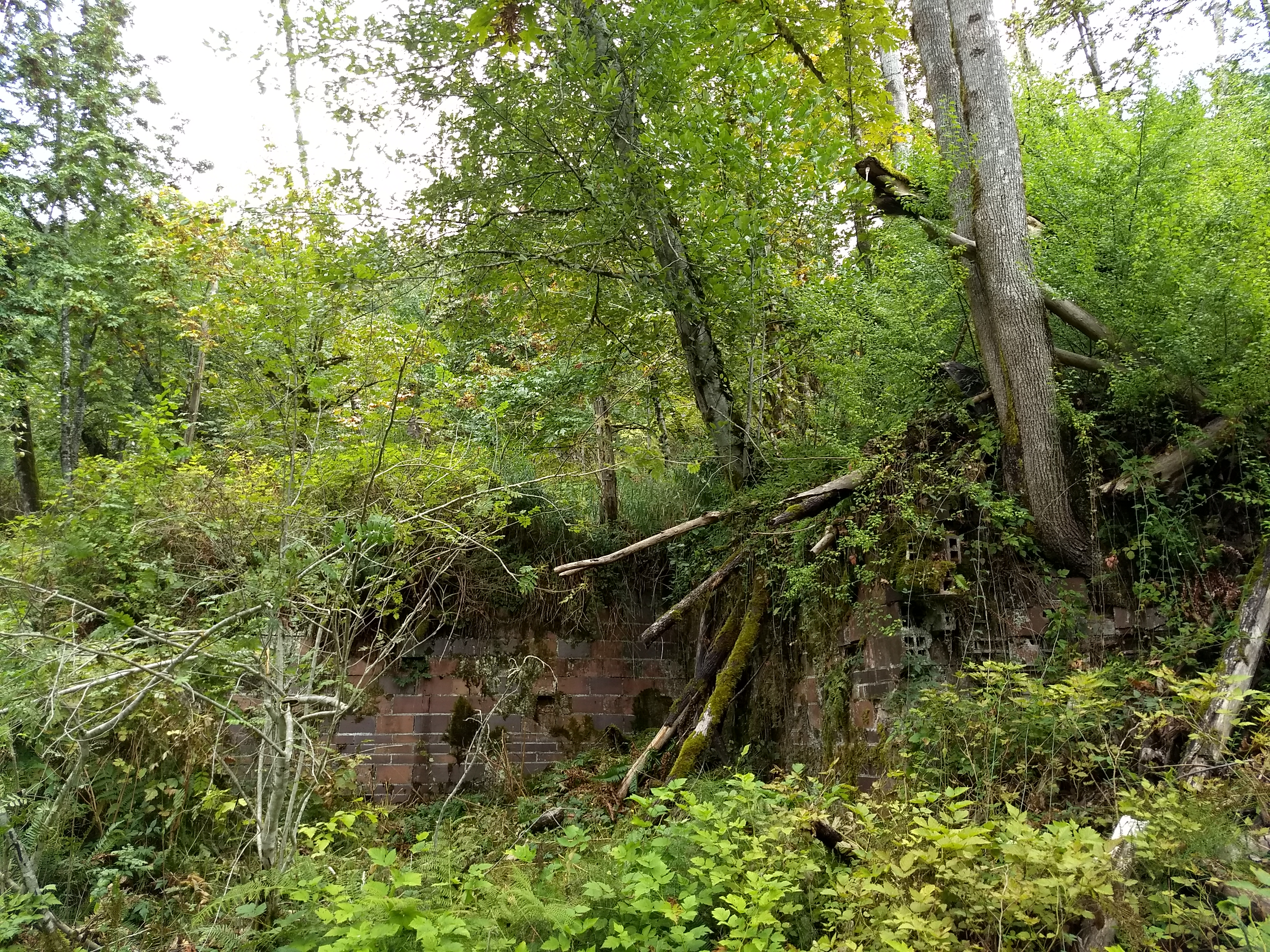
Remnants of factory in the ghost town of Taylor, Washington in September 2018.

What remains of Taylor is located within the Cedar River Watershed and is strictly off-limits. Seattle Public Utilities can reach the site via a gated service road. Little remains of the town, mine and factories beyond some of their foundations and a few brick and concrete walls. The railroad tracks once leading to the town have been removed with no obvious visible remains. Some stacks of various clay products that were unsold when the site was finally closed remain. As of 2018, a Monkey Puzzle Tree, once planted decoratively and not native to the area, still grows in what is once again a dense forest.
