= Page Organ Company =

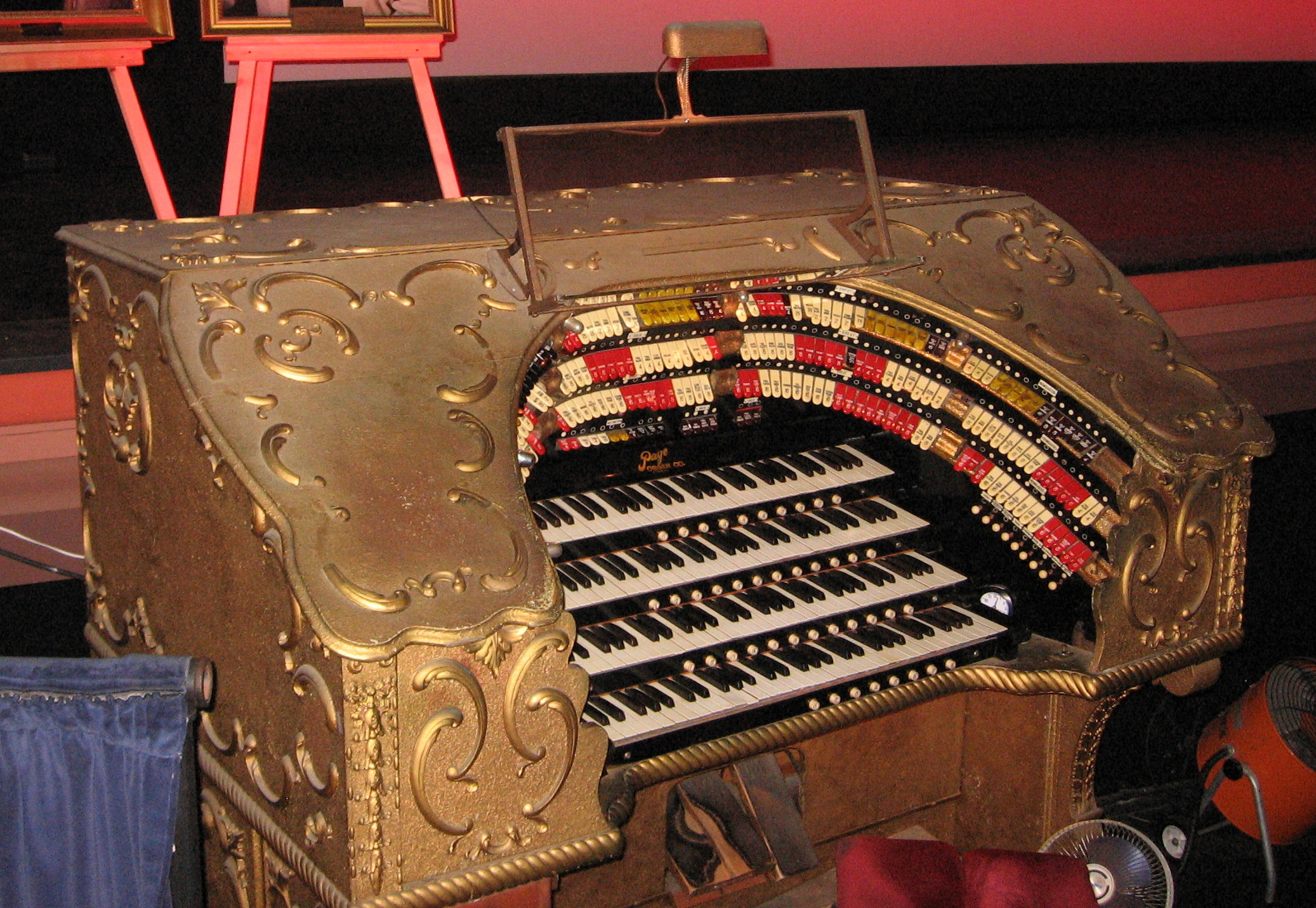
Console of the 4-manual, 16 rank Page Theatre Organ at the Catalina Casino, in Avalon, California.

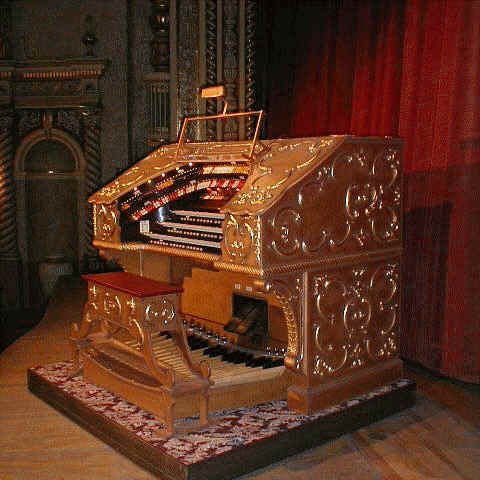
The Grand Page Organ, Paramount Theatre (Anderson, Indiana)

The Page Organ Company was an American manufacturer of theater pipe organs, located in Lima, Ohio.

The Page Company started very small, with a home-built organ in 1922. However, the company experienced much growth over the following decade, with a steady demand for theatre organs.

The company experienced a decline in the early 1930s with the introduction of sound films, coupled with the onset of the Depression. The company was sold to an employee named Ellsworth Beilharz in 1930, who initially assembled instruments from components purchased from the defunct Page Company.

In 1984, Beilharz sold the company to two employees, who remain in business under the name Lima Pipe Organ Company, Inc.

== Current organ installations ==
This list is incomplete. You can help by expanding it.

- Catalina Casino, Avalon, California
- Embassy Theatre, Fort Wayne, Indiana
- Hedback Community Theatre, Indianapolis, Indiana; has a Page/Wurlitzer organ
- Paramount Theatre, Anderson, Indiana
- Stephenson High School, DeKalb County, Georgia
- Sandusky State Theatre, Sandusky, Ohio; has a Page 3 organ
