= Denny-Renton Clay and Coal Company =

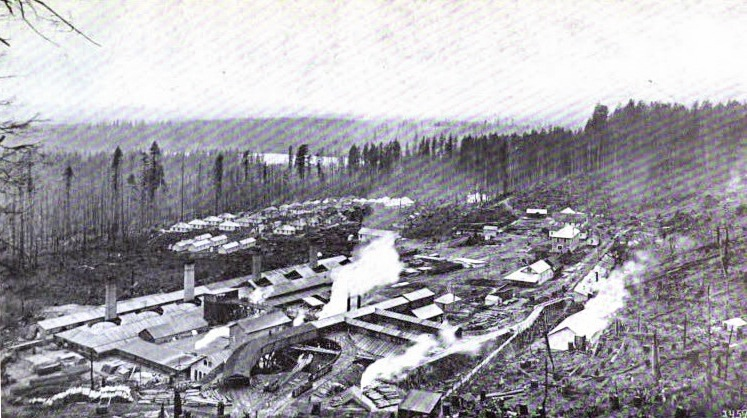
- Brickworks of the Denny-Renton Clay and Coal Company plant at Taylor, Washington in 1907
- Industry: Manufacturing
- Predecessor: Puget Sound Fire Clay Company, Denny Clay Company, Renton Brick Works
- Founded: 1892 in Seattle, Washington
- Founder: Arthur A. Denny
- Defunct: 1927
- Successor: Gladding, McBean
- Area served: Pacific Northwest
- Products: Brick, pipe, terra cotta
- Number of employees: 950 (1912)

Denny-Renton Clay and Coal Company, founded in 1892 as Denny Clay Company, was the largest producer of brick pavers in the world by 1905. An industry journal said in 1909 "The clay products of this company have long been a standard for general excellence in Seattle and the entire northwest" and described its products:

"Four great factories are operated by this big Seattle concern, one being devoted exclusively to the manufacture of sewer pipe, with a capacity of two miles of sewer pipe daily; one devoted exclusively to the manufacture of terra cotta; another, the Renton factory, manufactures paving brick of high quality, while the Taylor plant embraces the new sewer-pipe and hollow-ware, as well as the dry-press and fire-brick factories."

— Brick, 1909

The factory in Taylor, Washington, was near heavy glacial clay deposits in an 80-foot (24 m) high bank used to make the brick, and could produce 100,000 bricks a day in 1907. Hydraulic mining was used to extract clay from the hill. The factory produced 58 million bricks in 1917. It was closed when Taylor was condemned to become part of Seattle's Cedar River watershed in 1947.

== History ==
The company was founded by Seattle founder Arthur A. Denny in 1892 when he bought out predecessor company Puget Sound Fire Clay Company and named it Denny Clay Company. His son Orion O. Denny, who was the first baby boy born to the settlers of Seattle, became a vice-president of the company and president in 1899 when Arthur died. It merged with Renton Brick Works and was renamed Denny-Renton Clay and Coal Company. The company was bought by Gladding, McBean in 1927 and ceased to exist as a separate operation.

== Legacy in Seattle architecture ==
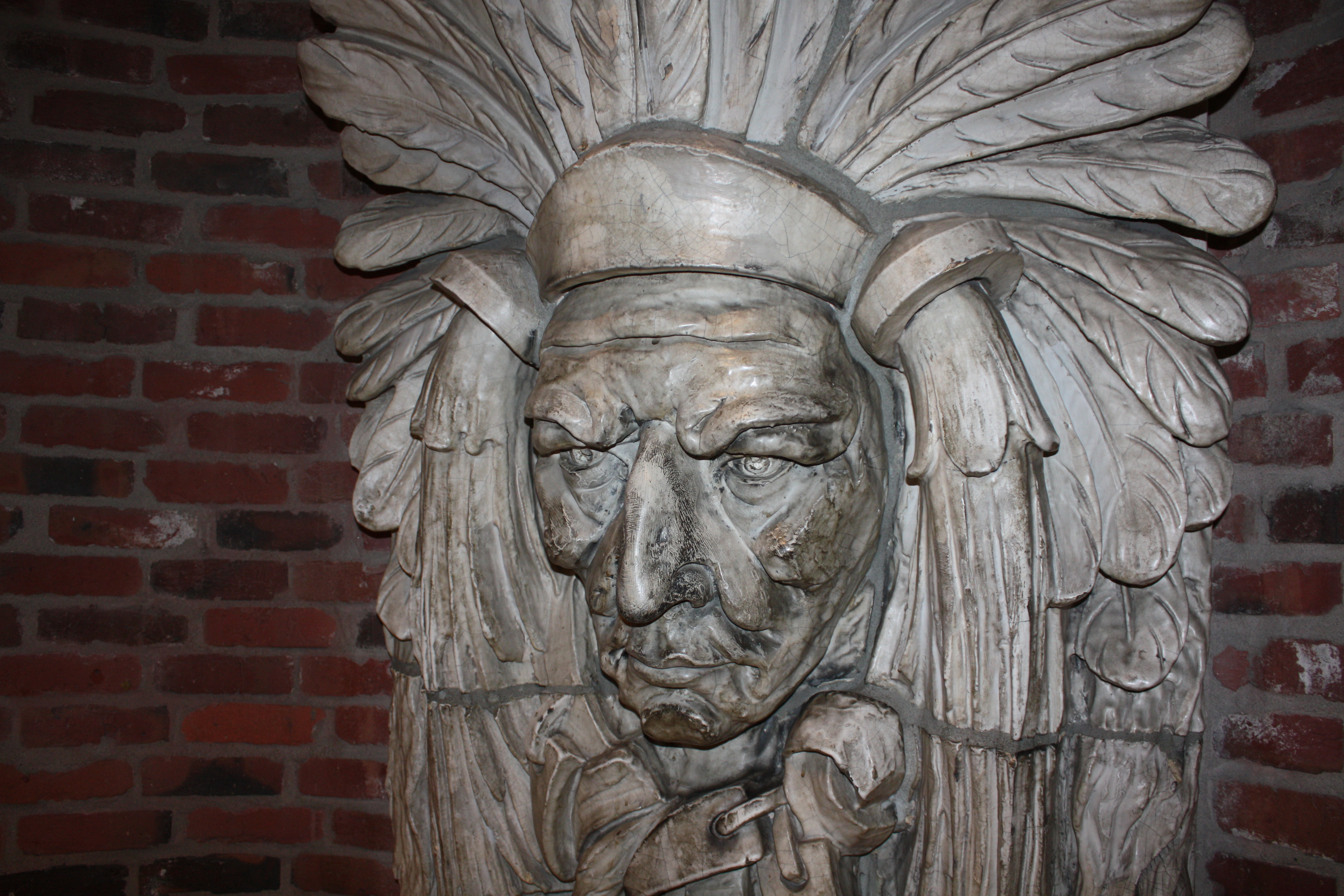
Terra cotta decorative element from the White-Henry-Stuart buildings in Downtown Seattle

Ornamental terra cotta from the Renton factory and other local factories is found in unusual abundance in buildings in Downtown Seattle, exemplified by the 1916 Arctic Building, and the University of Washington buildings designed by Bebb and Gould. The Indian head decoration on the Cobb Building and the Henry-White-Stuart buildings (now demolished) may have used Denny-Renton terra cotta. Pike Place Market, built in 1907, is paved with Denny Renton bricks.

== Renton brickworks today ==
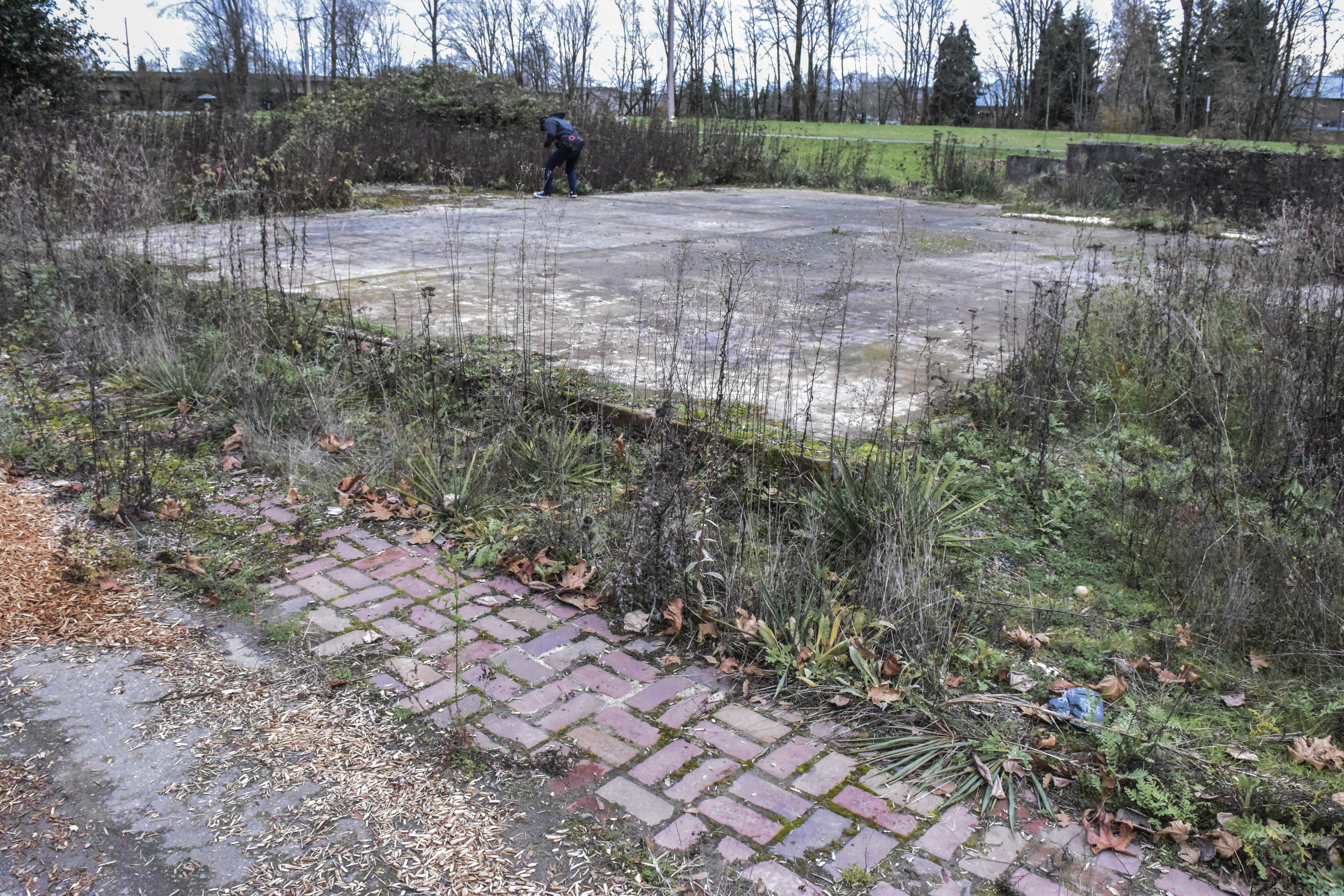
Foundations of the Renton brickworks

The location of the former Renton brickworks (47.479°N 122.198°W) is now a dog park in Renton on the Cedar River Trail, near its crossing with I-405.
