= David Malcolm Renton =

California building developer (1878–1947)

David Malcolm Renton (February 8, 1878 – May 27, 1947), known as "DM", was a builder and business executive in southern California. He is best known for his Craftsman style homes in Pasadena and for the construction of the Casino Ballroom and other homes on Catalina Island in the early 1900s. Renton was influential in the development of Catalina Island under William Wrigley Jr., serving as vice-president of the Santa Catalina Island Company and the Wilmington Transportation Company from 1919 to his retirement in 1936. He also served as president of Wilmington-Catalina Airline from 1931 to 1942.

== Life ==
David Malcolm "DM" Renton was born on Prince Edward Island, son of John and Catherine (Nicholson) Renton and one of six children. His father died when he was 14 years old, and Renton left home at the age of 16 to become an apprentice in the construction trade in Massachusetts in 1894. In 1902, he moved to Pasadena, California with two friends to establish the building company Upton, Ellsworth & Renton. He later pursued home building on his own as a general contractor.

In the early 1900s, California was growing at a rapid rate as westward expansion turned from the gold rush to a real estate boom. The development of railroad and automobile transportation was transforming Southern California into a winter vacation destination. Renton took advantage of the construction boom to make a name for himself. He was recruited in 1919 by gum magnate William Wrigley Jr. to implement resort development plans for Catalina Island on the basis of the quality of work done for Wrigley's private home in Pasadena. Renton became a trusted employee of Wrigley, who was based in Chicago, and undertook major development projects in real estate development, public works, tourism and local industry, including mining and pottery production. The most significant of these projects are listed below. The massive variety of development on the island also included the construction of a golf course and a spring training camp for the Chicago Cubs, ranching and farming, film and entertainment, an exotic bird park, and more.

In order to understand the scope of development in the 1920s, one can compare the count of visitors, which grew by more than a multiple of 8 in one decade. In 1919, the annual visitor count was 90,000 people and in 1930 it had reached 750,000 visitors. By the time Wrigley purchased Catalina Island in 1919, he had established a major international business selling gum through the William Wrigley Jr. Co. Through force of his marketing and advertising prowess, Wrigley had amassed a fortune with which he financed the majority of the projects Renton undertook for the company.

== Major works ==
=== Craftsman-style homes, 1902–1919 ===
As general contractor in southern California, Renton developed residential sub-divisions for the new summer populations moving to California, and included stately homes in both the Craftsman and bungalow courts. He also built homes in the Colonial Revival style. He built homes in Pasadena, Newport Beach, Orange Heights and Long Beach. He is known to have worked as contractor for well-known architectural design firms like Greene & Greene as well as building homes of his own design.

- 1080 North Hill Avenue, Pasadena, California
- 1415 Michigan Avenue, Pasadena, California built in 1914.

Two bungalow courts are listed on the National Register of Historic Places:

- Bryan Court at 427 S. Marengo Ave, Pasadena
- Bellevue Court on 440 S. Marengo Ave., Pasadena

=== Mt. Wilson Observatory, 1904 ===
Renton's first major solo job was the construction of the observation tower of the Mt. Wilson Observatory. The tower was built to house a 60-inch telescope for an astronomical observatory. The observatory was a project of the University of Chicago, under the direction of Professor George E. Hale and Professor Edwin Frost. Located at an elevation of 5700 feet on an undeveloped summit, the lumber for the building had to be packed to the mountaintop by mules. Surmounting these logistical challenges, Renton also built housing for astronomers in residence. For the Mt. Wilson Toll Co. he additionally built forty bungalows and a hotel, which was completed in 1904.

=== Atwater Hotel, Catalina Island, 1920 ===
When William Wrigley Jr. solicited bids for new construction on Catalina Island, Renton was awarded the first contract to build new summer bungalows. Thereafter, Renton was kept on for further development, including the 160-room Atwater Hotel. When Wrigley proposed to have a brand new hotel built in time for the opening of the 1920 summer season, contractors on the mainland did not think it was possible since all materials had to be shipped from the mainland by barge and labor was not readily available. Machinery from Renton's lumber mill was relocated to the island to produce all the required furniture on-site in the spring of 1920. The hotel opened July 1, 1920. The hotel was built in combination with a cafeteria covering an entire city block that could serve 1,500 and was billed as the largest in the world.

=== Mt. Ada, Catalina Island, 1921 ===
After purchasing Catalina Island, William Wrigley Jr. commissioned Renton to design and build another private residence on a hill overlooking the south end of Avalon Bay. The Georgian Colonial home, named after Wrigley's wife and designed according to her ideas, was begun in 1920 and completed in 1921. The home was placed on the National Register of Historic Places in 1985 and is now operated as the "Inn at Mount Ada." Walter Harris was a draughtsman for Renton and Nils A. Walberg (1862–1933) was an artist and decorator for Mt. Ada.

=== Zinc and silver mining, Catalina Island, 1923–1927 ===
Interested in the possibility of mining on Catalina Island from water well drilling and a brief episode of mining activity there in 1864, Renton established a mine at Blackjack Mountain in 1923. The first ore shipment was sent to smelters with about twenty tons of raw ore containing silver, lead and zinc. During the four years of operations, additional mines were opened up at Pebbly Beach, Renton Vein and Cherry Valley. From February to November 1926, they manufactured and shipped close to 3,000 tons of concentrates and received returns of over $90,000. When mining operations were closed due to an international drop in ore prices in 1927, DM had a 100-ton flotation mill in operation at White's Landing, together with aerial cable tramways conveying the ore from the mines to the mill.

The mining on Catalina Island under Renton's management was notable for the use of salt water flotation in separating the zinc and silver from the raw ore. In the 1920s, oil flotation was the standard process for collecting mineral particles from sulfide ore in a liquid slurry. At the time, salt water had not been used in a flotation mill and it had not been shown that organic compounds could be effective floating agents.

Although the chemists and engineers consulted had advised that salt water would not work in theory for the flotation mill, with practical application it was discovered that kelp and saltwater organisms furnish potassium iodide needed to successfully separate minerals in a salt water mill. Separating the silver, lead and zinc was further helped by an accidental addition of kerosene and linseed oil which naturally precipitated iron pyrites. Based on their successes, metallurgical and mining engineers came to look at the mining works and examine the quality of concentrates achieved with a salt water flotation system.

=== Thompson Dam, Catalina Island, 1924 ===
Developing Catalina Island as a resort meant undertaking a major public works project to find water sources on the island through a system of wells and reservoirs. Prior to 1919, the majority of fresh water on the island was supplied by barge. Water development culminated in 1924 in the construction of a 100,000,000 gallon reservoir, contained by the Thompson Dam, which was connected to supply the town of Avalon via 12 miles of pipeline from the island interior. A major feature of the achievement was the engineering to lay the pipe over a 1460 ft mountain peak.

=== Catalina Pottery, 1927–1937 ===
In 1927, Wrigley and Renton decided to construct a tile factory using Catalina clay from the hills that they had analyzed to produce building materials and other fine items. The idea was to meet the demand for roof and enamel tiles in the major construction that was booming in California, in conjunction with the Spanish Mission revival architecture style. Beginning with construction materials to be sold on the mainland, Renton experimented with other products including souvenirs, vases, bookends and figurines.

The factory produced trial souvenirs in the intervening years before Catalina Clay Products was founded and expanded the line of offerings in 1930. Using red and white clays found on the island, the products were fired with enamels of local mineral oxides to produce distinctive Catalina colors. A storefront opened in Avalon in the summer of 1930. By 1931, business was promising enough that Renton decided to open branches on the mainland: in both Hollywood and the Mexican style section of Los Angeles known as Olvera Street. Their pottery and signature painted tile and wrought iron tables were picked up by major department stores. A Los Angeles Times article ("Ancient Pottery Art Revived" December 27, 1931) noted that "Avalon-ware is recognizable for its flint-like hardness and beauty of form and color..."

The business was sold by Philip K. Wrigley to the Gladding, McBean company in 1937. Today, Catalina Pottery is a treasured collector's item.

=== Casino Ballroom, Catalina Island, 1929 ===
The Casino Ballroom on Catalina Island is an iconic Art Deco style building. It is distinctive in design with a cantilevered roof for a large circular ballroom without any pillar support. The building was designed by the firm Webber & Spaulding, and Renton managed the construction of the massive $2 million building which began in April 1928 and was completed May 1929.

=== Wrigley Memorial, Catalina Island, 1932 ===
Over the two decades they had worked closely together, Wrigley and Renton had formed a close working relationship. Wrigley often referred to Renton as his "hands" in being trusted to carry out their plans, but they also shared a certain type of energy and enthusiasm for thinking ambitiously and creating something where nothing stood before. Renton's final construction project for his boss was to build the Wrigley Memorial. The plans for the tomb used Catalina materials, flagstone and tiles, in a magnificent 80-ft high resting place that is now a part of the Wrigley Botanical Gardens.

=== El Encanto, Catalina Island, 1933 ===
As his own independent project, Renton developed the "Paseo del Encanto" (Promenade of Enchantment), which opened in August 1933. He engaged artists and performances with Señora Consuelo de Bonzo, who owned the Casa de la Golondrina on Olivera street. El Encanto matched a new development program that Wrigley's son (Philip K. Wrigley) and president of the Santa Catalina Island Company had outlined to preserve the atmosphere of old California in Catalina's history and natural ruggedness.

== Personal life ==
Renton married twice. In 1906 he married Elizabeth Blaisdell Ryder and had two sons: Malcolm Joseph Renton and Arthur Lincoln Renton. His first wife died in 1935 and Renton remarried to Isabel Blanche Cline in 1937. When Renton retired in 1936, he lived at a cattle ranch in Atascadero, California, "Rancho Santa Catalina," until he died in 1947. He was a member of the Masonic order (32nd degree, Shriner) and the Scottish Rite Consistory.
