= Paramount Theatre (Anderson, Indiana) =

- U.S. National Register of Historic Places
- U.S. Historic district – Contributing property
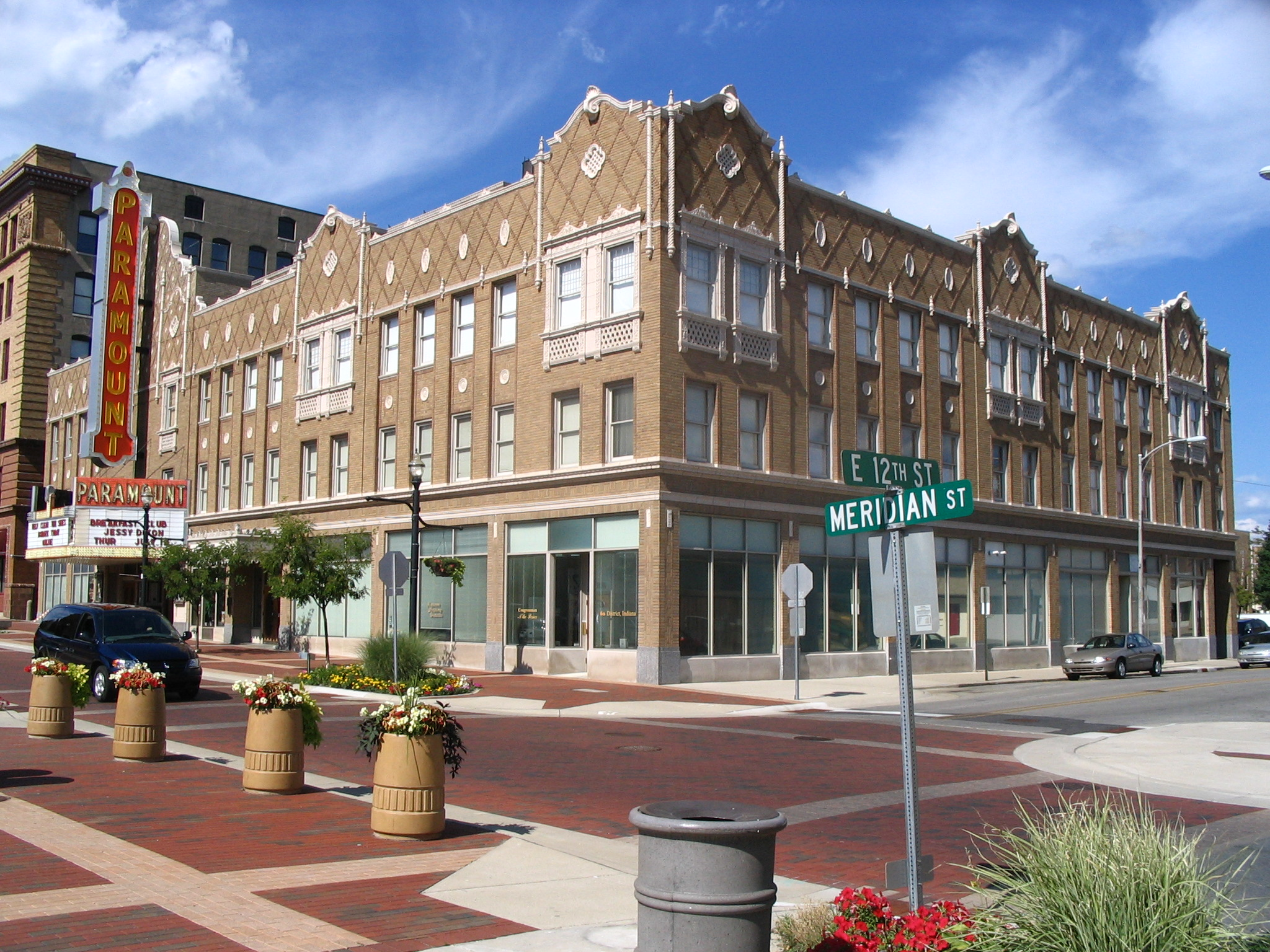
- Paramount Theater, July 2007

- Location within Indiana Location within the United States
- Location: 1124 Meridian St., Anderson, Indiana
- Coordinates: 40°6′15.9″N 85°40′44.19″W
- Area: Less than one acre
- Architect: John Eberson
- Architectural style: Mission/Spanish Revival
- NRHP reference No.: 91001165
- Added to NRHP: August 29, 1991

The Paramount Theatre Centre & Ballroom (Formally known as The Anderson Paramount Theatre) is a historic movie palace located in Anderson, Madison County, Indiana. It opened on August 20, 1929, and at the time was part of the Publix Chain of theaters, owned by Paramount Pictures (hence the theater's name). The theater was designed by the famous movie theater architect, John Eberson. The Paramount is an atmospheric theater (an architectural style that gave the appearance of an open star-filled sky) and is one of twelve atmospheric theaters left standing in the United States and Canada. The auditorium was decorated in the style of a Spanish village.

It was listed in the National Register of Historic Places in 1991.

The theater has been extensively restored and reopened in 1995 as the Paramount Theatre Centre and Ballroom. The theater includes its original Page theater organ, now restored. A contest for "Best Decorated Christmas Tree" is held in the theater every Christmas.
