= Schine State Theatre =

- U.S. National Register of Historic Places
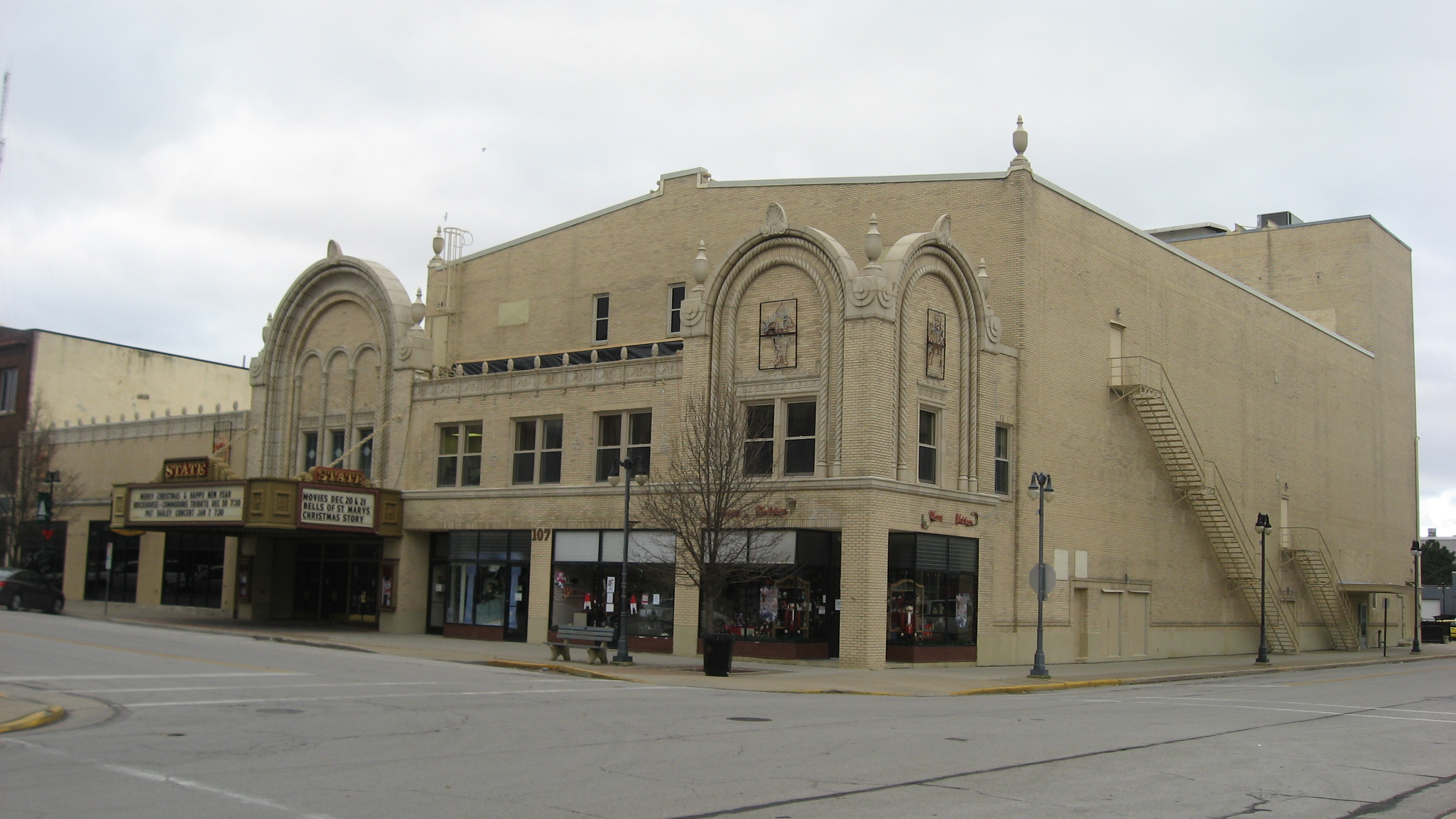
- Schine State Theatre, 2011
- Location: 101–109 Columbus Ave., Sandusky, Erie County, Ohio, United States
- Coordinates: 41.456944°N 82.7125°W
- Part of: Sandusky MRA
- NRHP reference No.: 82001435
- Added to NRHP: October 20, 1982

Schine State Theatre, also known as the State Theatre, or the Sandusky State Theatre, is a historic theater building in Sandusky, Ohio, United States. It has been listed on the National Register of Historic Places since 1982.

== History ==
The building opened as a 1,800-seat vaudeville theatre on October 12, 1928, and featured a Page 3 pipe organ. In September 1930 the theatre was purchased by Warner Bros. Circuit Management Corp.. In 1933, the building was taken over by the Seltz Theatre Company.

The Sandusky State Theatre Inc. foundation was formed as a non-profit 501(c)(3) organization in 1988, to restore the structure.

In June 2020, the roof and part of the building collapsed after a large storm. It was then extensively renovated, and reopened in late 2023. An endowment fund for the building was established at the Erie County Community Foundation to help insure the theatre’s future operations.

== See also ==
- National Register of Historic Places listings in Erie County, Ohio
- National Register of Historic Places listings in Sandusky, Ohio
