= Gladding, McBean =

Industrial ceramics company in Lincoln, California

Gladding, McBean LLC.
- Type: Private
- Industry: Ceramic manufacturing
- Predecessor: Gladding, McBean & Company
- Founded: 1875
- Founder: Charles Gladding, Peter McGill McBean and George Chambers
- Successor: International Pipe & Ceramics (Interpace)
- Headquarters: Lincoln, California, United States
- Key people: Pacific Coast Building Products, President & CEO, Dave Lucchetti
- Products: Clay sewer pipe, chimney tops, roof tile, and terracotta garden ware
- Parent: Pacific Coast Building Products, Inc.
- Website: www.gladdingmcbean.com

Gladding, McBean is an American ceramics company located in Lincoln, California. It is one of the oldest companies in California, a pioneer in ceramics technology, and a company which has "contributed immeasurably" to the state's industrialization. During the heyday of architectural terra cotta, the company "dominated the industry in California and the Far West."

== History ==
=== Founding ===
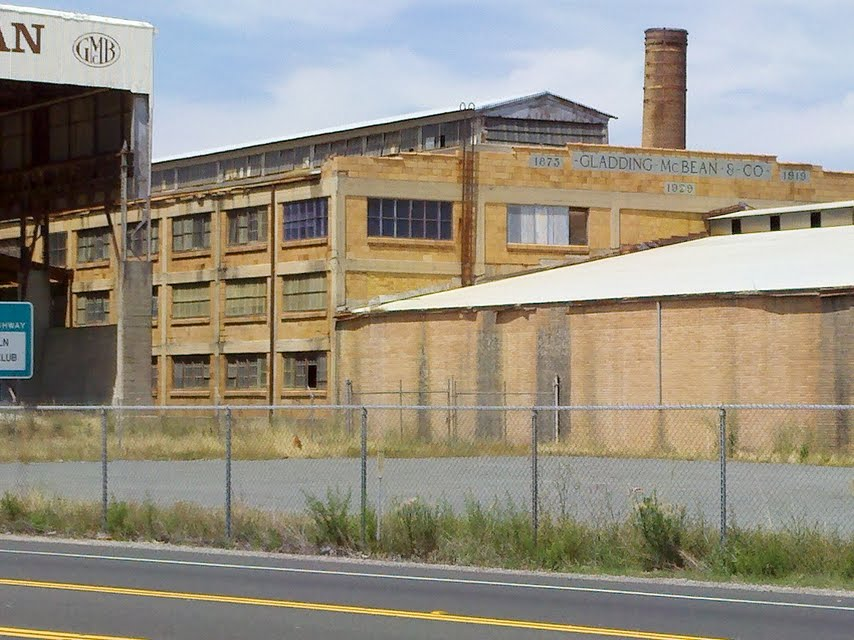
Gladding, McBean factory in Lincoln, California

Charles Gladding (1828–1894) was born in Buffalo, New York, served as a first lieutenant in the Union Army during the Civil War, and later moved to Chicago, where he engaged in the clay sewer pipe business. He came to California in 1874 looking for new business opportunities. While in California, he read an article in a San Francisco newspaper about a large clay deposit near the town of Lincoln, California. Investigating, Gladding verified that it was an "unusually fine deposit of white kaolin clay" located close to a railroad line, and selected the spot as the site for a new business. Gladding, along with Peter McGill McBean and George Chambers, established Gladding-McBean in 1875. Its original product was clay sewer pipe. By 1883, the company had grown to 75 employees, and it then evolved into a major manufacturer of architectural terra-cotta. Peter McBean became president of the company after Charles Gladding's death in 1894, and his son Athol McBean later served as chairman of the board.

=== Growth, acquisitions, and merger ===
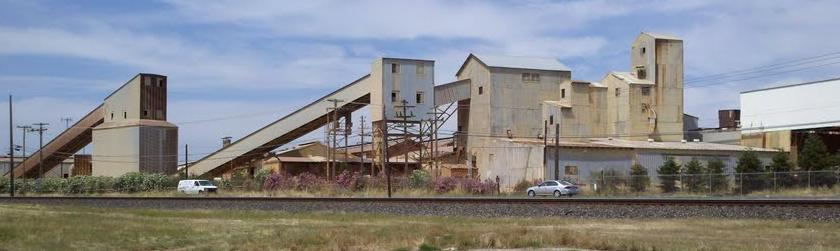
Gladding McBean's factory in Lincoln, California

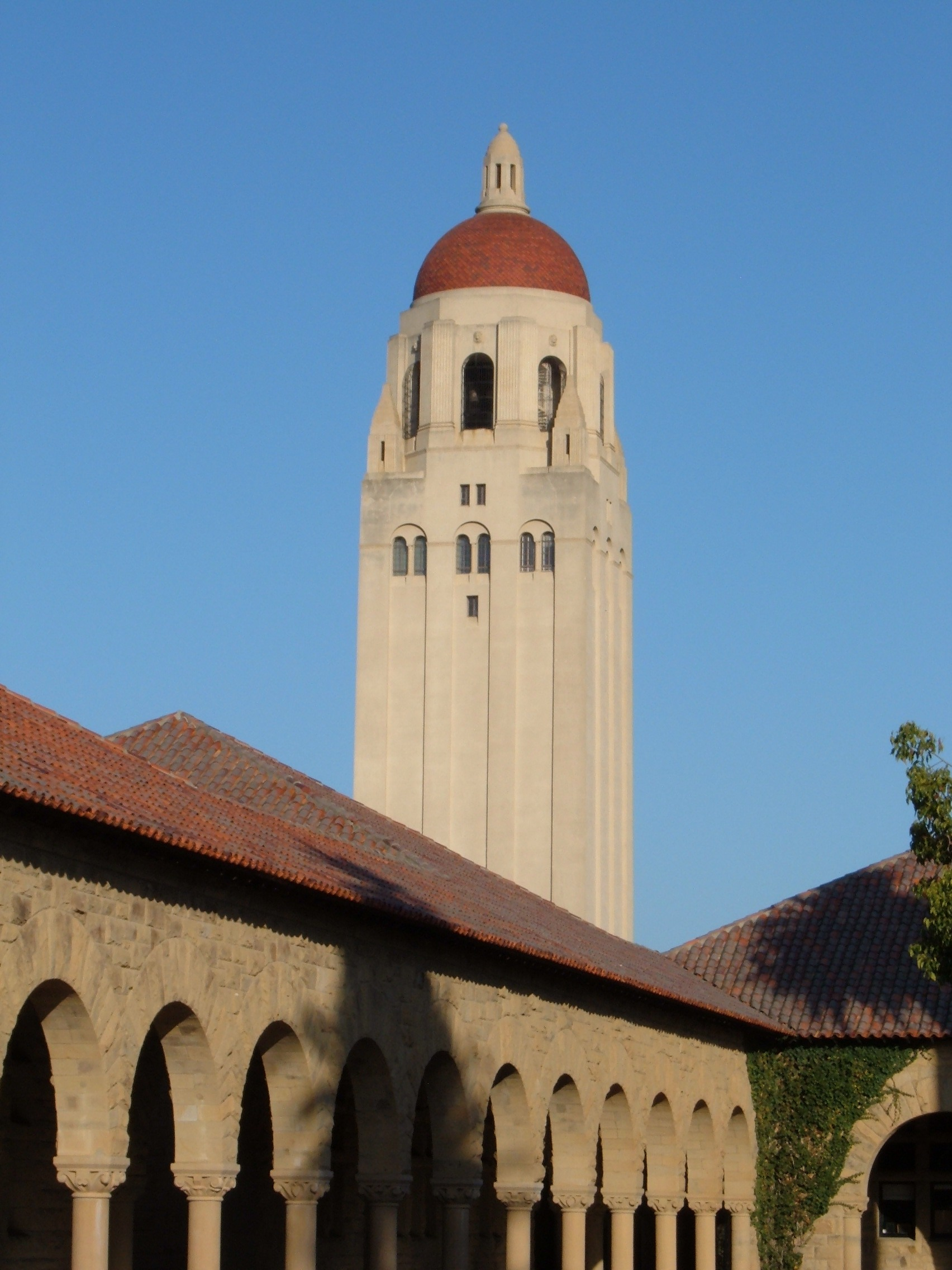
Gladding, McBean roof tile and architectural terra cotta details decorate most buildings at Stanford University.

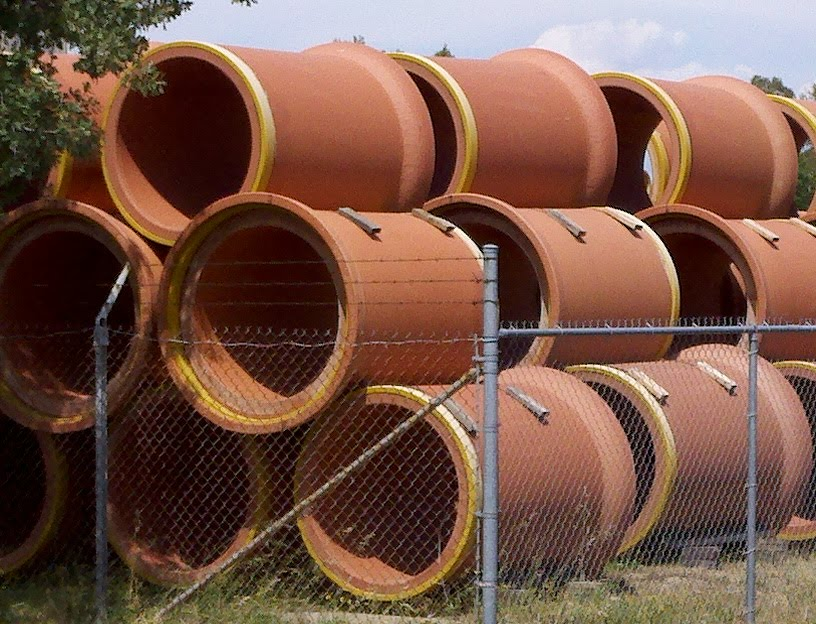
Clay sewer pipe stored at Gladding, McBean

In June 1923, the company acquired the controlling stock of Tropico Potteries, Inc. of Los Angeles. In 1925, the company purchased all the holdings of the Northern Clay Products Company including the Auburn, Washington terra cotta plant. In 1926, the company merged with the Los Angeles Pressed Brick Company. After this merger, the company had plants in Los Angeles, Santa Monica, Point Richmond, and Alberhill, California. The former Los Angeles Pressed Brick Company's plant at 922 Date Street became Gladding, McBean's Los Angeles plant.

In 1927, the company acquired the holdings of the Denny-Renton Clay and Coal Company which included the terra cotta plant in Renton, Washington, the plant and mines in Taylor and Mica, Washington. The company closed their plant in Van Aselt, Washington in 1927. Tropico Potteries, Inc. filed for dissolution of the corporation in 1928 merging with Gladding, McBean. The former Tropico Potteries's plant at 2901 Los Feliz Boulevard became the company's Glendale plant.

Due to the Great Depression, the Auburn plant closed in 1932. All operations were consolidated with the Renton plant. The Taylor coal and clay mines and the town were condemned by the Seattle Water Department in order to include the area inside an expanded watershed. In 1933, the company bought the "entire holdings on the Pacific Coast of the American Encaustic Tiling Company, Ltd., of New York".

Since the demand for building materials dwindled, the company began to look for new products. The company expanded into tableware. In 1932, experimental work in Dinnerware began at the Glendale plant in Los Angeles. In 1934, Gladding, McBean introduced the Franciscan Pottery line of dinnerware and art ware, named after the Franciscan friars who established missions throughout California in the 18th and 19th centuries. The lines were very successful. In 1937, Gladding, McBean and Co. purchased the Catalina Clay Products Division of Santa Catalina Island Co. The company closed the pottery moving all molds and equipment to the Glendale plant. The company continued to use the tradename of Catalina Pottery on select dinnerware and art ware lines produced in the Glendale plant until 1942. In 1940, the company introduced the hand-painted embossed pattern Franciscan Apple, and in 1941 Desert Rose. Both patterns became the company's most popular patterns. The company introduced fine china dinnerware in 1942 and due to World War II, discontinued all art ware lines.

By 1950, it was considered one of the "world's largest ceramics manufacturers". In 1957, they purchased Washington Brick and Lime and its factories located in Dishman, Washington and Clayton, Washington. The company was described at that time as "the West's largest ceramics firm" with seven plants in California and two in Washington, in addition to those acquired in that purchase.

Because of "the importation of inexpensive Japanese ceramics", Gladding McBean's tableware sales declined in the post World War II period. This was a factor in Gladding-McBean's decision to seek a merger. In 1962, the company merged with the Lock Joint Pipe Company, which resulted in the creation of the International Pipe and Ceramics Corporation, shortened to Interpace Corp. in 1968.

=== Decline and revival ===
In 1976 Interpace Corp. "announced their intention to cease operations at the Lincoln plant" where Gladding, McBean began. Pacific Coast Building Products then purchased the Lincoln factory and restored the historic name of Gladding, McBean, which remains in business today. Interpace Corp. sold its Franciscan Ceramics division to Josiah Wedgwood and Sons Ltd. in 1979. In 1984 production was moved to Wedgwood's Stoke-on-Trent facility in England.

The company now operates as a division of Pacific Coast Building Products Inc under the name Gladding, McBean, LLC. Hard hit by the recession, the company had 110 employees in 2010, "down from an average of 240 workers between 2001 and 2007". The company sponsors an annual "Feats of Clay" ceramic arts festival in Lincoln.

== Products and legacy ==
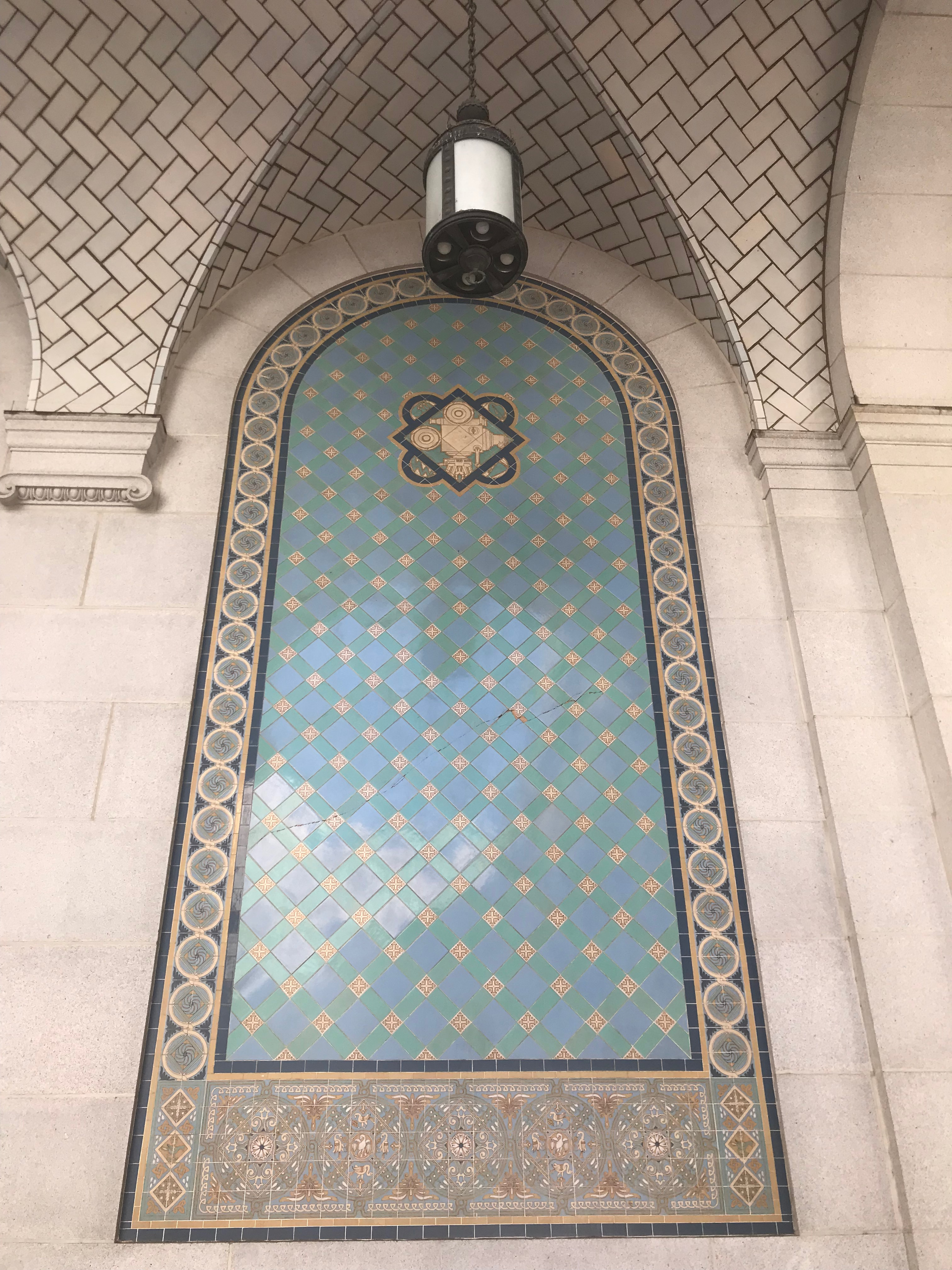
Gladding, McBean tile mural at Los Angeles City Hall

From its base in clay sewer pipe and terra cotta, the company expanded into brick production and then branched out to dinnerware in the 1930s, with its Franciscan and Catalina lines.

In 1959, the company was awarded a "subcontract in excess of $500,000 for the production of ceramic radomes." That year, a spokesman for the company "cited research in oxides and other rare earths as providing a solution to the high heat, speed and radiation problems of the space age," and identified the company's best selling products at that time as "dinnerware, tile, refractories, facebrick, clay pipe and conduit, and technical ceramics." The company now identifies its main products as clay roof tile, piazza floor tile, chimney tops and caps, terra cotta, garden pottery and clay sewer pipe.

The California State Library now holds the company's job files from 1888 to 1966, documenting the use of its products to decorate thousands of buildings, including most major structures on the campus of Stanford University. The red roof tiles and architectural terra cotta details helped achieve the distinctive Spanish Colonial Revival style so common to coastal California. While many of the buildings throughout the west coast have been demolished, such as the Richfield Tower in Los Angeles, beautiful examples remain, including San Diego's Spreckels Theater and the Ventura County Courthouse.

== See also ==
- Roof tiles
- Ludowici Roof Tile
- California pottery
- Franciscan Ceramics
