= Santa Catalina Island (California) =

Channel Island off the coast of California

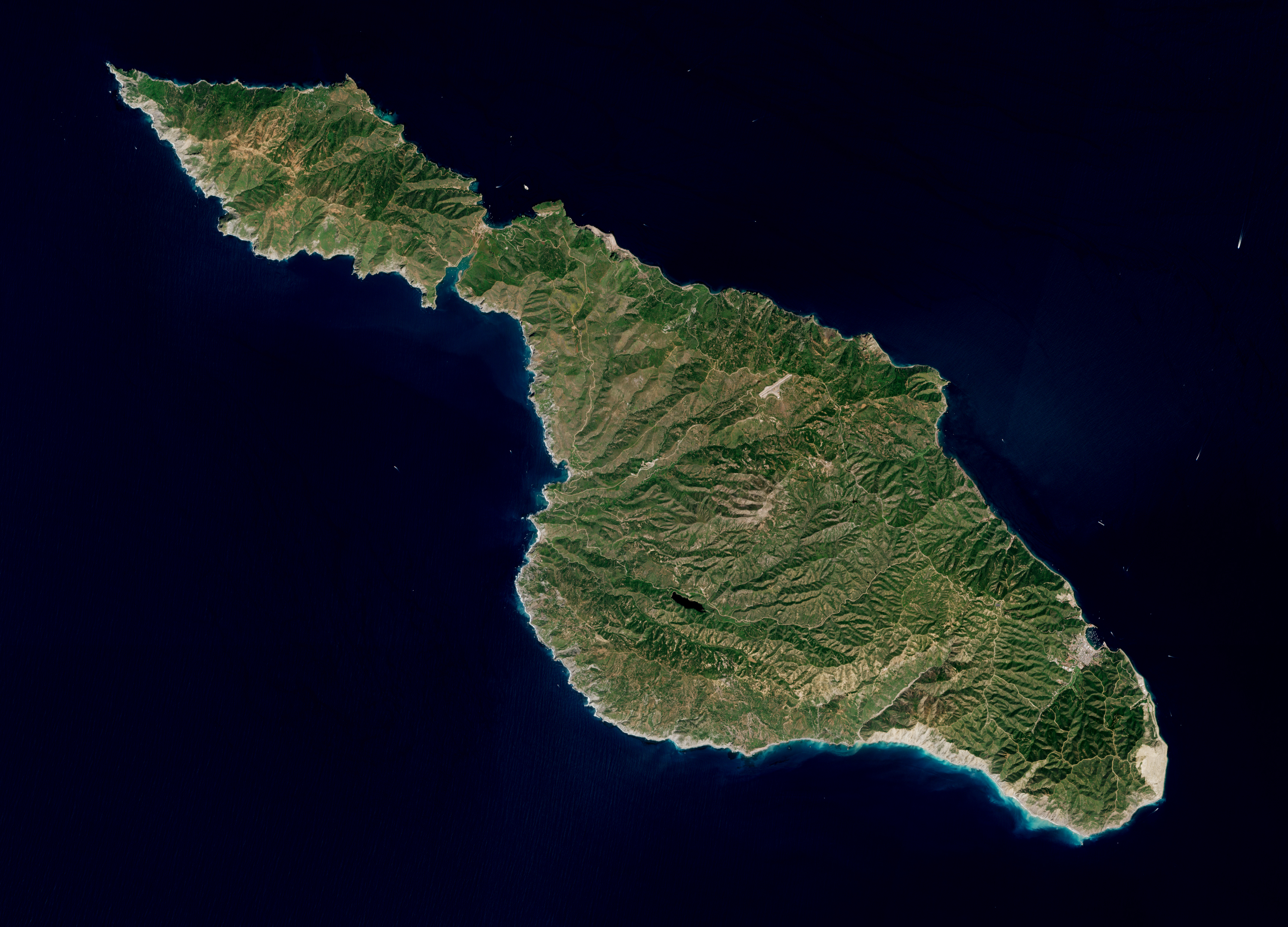
- Santa Catalina Island satellite image

- Santa Catalina Island Santa Catalina Island (California)
- Other names: Catalina Island; Catalina

Geography
- Location: Pacific Ocean
- Coordinates: 33°23′N 118°25′W
- Archipelago: Channel Islands of California
- Area: 74.98 sq mi (194.2 km^{2})
- Highest elevation: 2,097 ft (639.2 m)
- Highest point: Mount Orizaba

Administration
- United States
- State: California
- County: Los Angeles
- Largest settlement: Avalon (pop. 3,460)

Demographics
- Population: 3,715 (2020)
- Pop. density: 55/sq mi (21.2/km^{2})

Santa Catalina Island (Spanish: Isla Santa Catalina; Tongva: Pimu), often shortened to Catalina Island or Catalina, is a rocky island, part of the Channel Islands, off the coast of Southern California in the Gulf of Santa Catalina. The island covers an area of about 75 square miles (194 square kilometers), measuring 22 miles (35 km) long and 8 miles (13 km) across at its widest point. The island's highest peak is Mount Orizaba, rising to an elevation of 2,097 feet (639 meters). The island is situated in the Pacific Ocean, 29 mi (47 km) south-southwest of Long Beach, California. Politically, Catalina Island is part of Los Angeles County in District 4. Most of the island's land is unincorporated and is thus governed by the county.

Catalina was originally inhabited and used by many different Southern California Tribes. The first European colonists to arrive on the island claimed it for the Spanish Empire. Over the years, territorial claims to the island transferred ownership to Mexico and then to the United States of America. The island was used for otter hunting and gold-digging, before successfully being developed into a tourist destination in the 1920s. Since the 1970s, most of the island has been administered by the Catalina Island Conservancy.

In the 2020 census, Santa Catalina Island's population was 3,715 people, 93 percent of whom live in the island's only incorporated city, Avalon. The second center of population is the unincorporated village of Two Harbors at the island's isthmus. Development also occurs at the smaller settlements of Rancho Escondido and Middle Ranch. The remaining population is scattered over the island between the two population centers.

Today, it can be reached via ferry services from mainland California, with the most common departure point being the city of Long Beach. The island also has an airport, the Catalina Airport.

Catalina Island is known for its diverse ecosystems, which include coastal scrub, chaparral, oak woodlands, grasslands, and coastal marine environments. It is also home to various native and introduced species, both on land and in the surrounding waters. Unique species include the island fox and the Catalina two striped garter snake. The city of Avalon, California, located on the island's eastern side, is the primary population center and serves as the hub for tourism. Catalina Island has a Mediterranean climate, with wet winters and warm, dry summers. Throughout the year, Catalina Island hosts a variety of events and activities, including the Catalina Wine Mixer, the Catalina Island JazzTrax Festival. A tourist-drawing area, Catalina is heavily reliant economically on revenue from its annual visitors.

== History ==
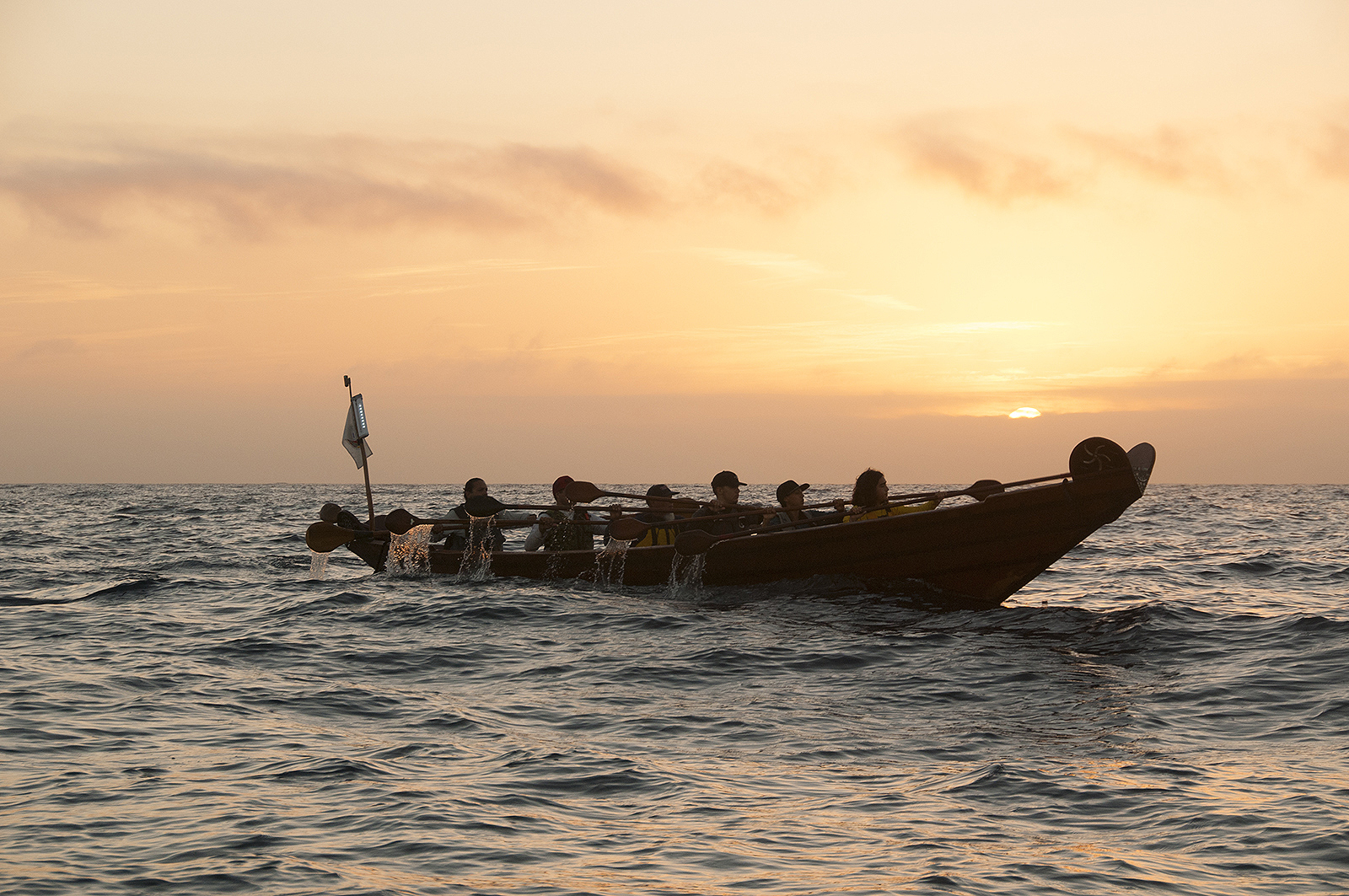
Ti'at are plank boats still constructed by the Tongva to travel from the mainland to the Santa Catalina Island, similar to the Chumash tomol (pictured).

Archeological evidence of human settlement dates back to 7000 BC. Prior to the modern era, the island was inhabited by the Tongva, who had the villages Chowigna (San Pedro) and Guashna (Playa del Rey), regularly traveled back and forth to Catalina for trade. The Tongva had settlements all over the island, with their biggest villages being at the Isthmus and at present-day Avalon, Shark/Little Harbor, and Emerald Bay. They were renowned for their mining, working and the trade of soapstone which was found in great quantities and varieties on the island. This material was in great demand and was traded along the California coast. The island was valued for its natural resources, but was also respected by the Tongva as an important "ceremonial center" with connections to the village of Povuu'nga, located in present-day Long Beach.

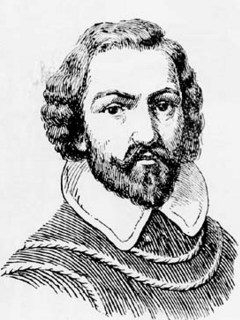
Juan Rodríguez Cabrillo

During European colonization, the first European to set foot on the island was the Portuguese explorer Juan Rodríguez Cabrillo, who sailed to the west coast in the name of the Spanish crown. On October 7, 1542, he claimed the island for Spain and named it “San Salvador” after his ship. Over half a century later, another Spanish explorer, Sebastián Vizcaíno, arrived at the island on the eve of Saint Catherine's day (November 24) of 1602. Vizcaino renamed the island in the saint's honor. The colonization of California by the Spanish greatly contributed to the decline of the Pimugnans because of diseases brought by the Spanish from Europe. By the 1830s, the island's entire native population had been forced to the mainland on the Spanish missions or to work as ranch hands for the many private land owners.

In the late 18th century, the Franciscan friars considered building a mission on Catalina, but abandoned the idea due to the island's rugged terrain, small population size, and lack of fresh water. While Spain maintained its claim on Catalina Island, the Europeans were forbidden to trade with colonies. However, this policy was short lasted as the island lacked the ships to enforce this prohibition; also, much of the colonies wanted to trade with other European powers. During the period stretching from the late 18th to early 19th centuries, Russian hunters from the Aleutian Islands, particularly the Russian-American Company, visited Catalina Island as part of their fur trading expeditions. They were primarily interested in harvesting sea otters for their valuable fur, which led to the decimation of the local sea otter population. The hunting by the Russian-American caused a profound ecological impact on the marine life around Catalina Island by depleting a keystone species.

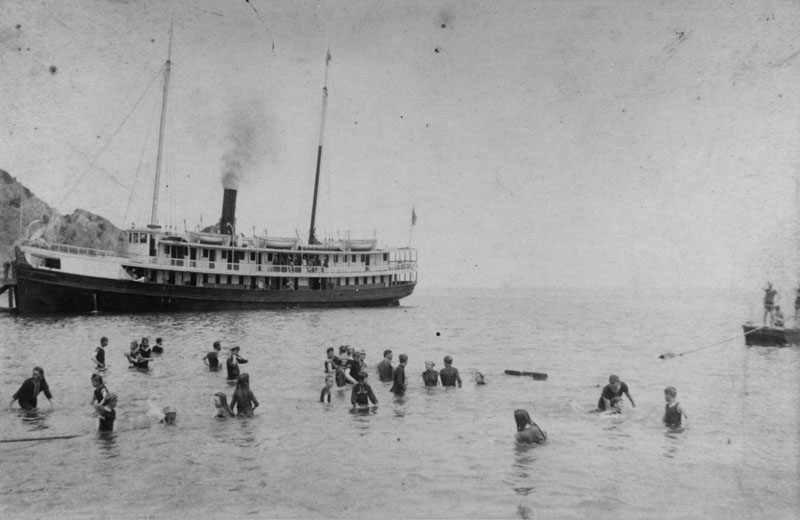
Tourists enjoying the waters off Catalina in 1889

With its numerous hidden coves and relatively low population, the island was an attractive location for pirates and smugglers. While there are historical indications that such activities may have occurred, documented accounts of piracy or significant smuggling operations on the island are limited. During the 1850s and 1860s, Catalina Island witnessed a minor gold rush, as part of the larger California Gold Rush. Gold miners arrived on the island in search of valuable minerals. However, their scale and success was nothing to be compared to the more prosperous gold rush locations in California. The historical evidence regarding substantial gold deposits on the island remains inconclusive. In 1846, Californio Governor Pío Pico made a Mexican land grant of the Island of Santa Catalina to Thomas M. Robbins, as Rancho Santa Catalina. Robbins established a small ranch on the island, but sold it in 1850 to José María Covarrubias. A claim was filed with the Public Land Commission in 1853, and in 1867, the grant was officially patented to José María Covarrubias. Covarrubias, in turn, sold the island to Albert Packard of Santa Barbara in 1853. By 1864, the entirety of Catalina Island was under the ownership of James Lick, whose estate maintained control over the island for the following approximately 25 years.

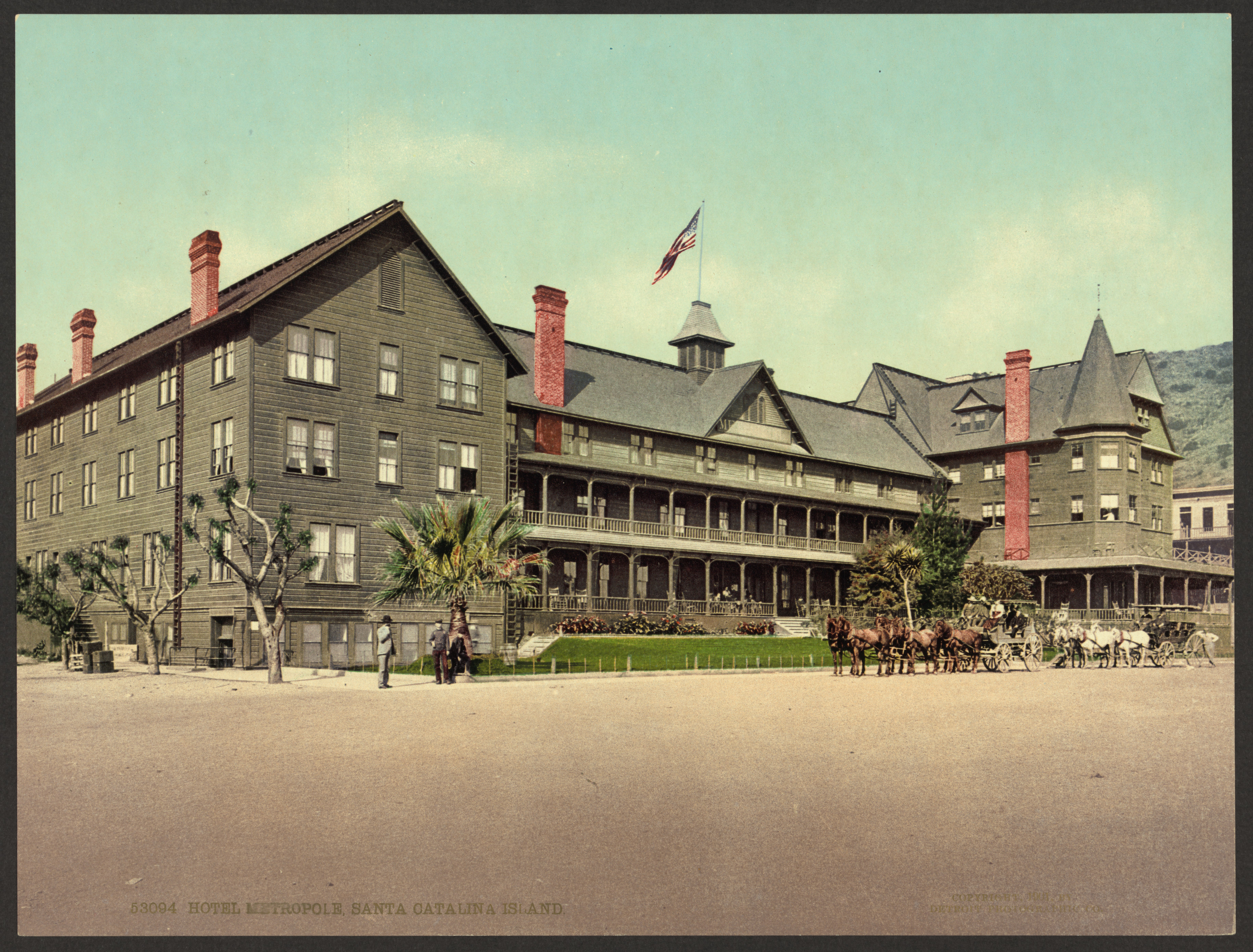
Hotel Metropole in 1901

By the end of the 19th century, the island was almost uninhabited except for a few cattle herders. The first owner to try to develop Avalon into a resort destination was George Shatto, a real estate speculator from Grand Rapids, Michigan. Shatto purchased the island for $200,000 (equivalent to $6.3 million in 2025) from the Lick estate at the height of the real estate boom in Southern California in 1887. Shatto created the settlement that would become Avalon, and can be credited with building the town's first hotel, the original Hotel Metropole, and pier. Despite Shatto's efforts, he defaulted on his loan after only a few years and the island went back to the Lick estate. The sons of Phineas Banning bought the island in 1891 from the estate of James Lick. The Banning brothers fulfilled Shatto's dream of making Avalon a resort community with the construction of numerous tourist facilities. On November 29, 1915, a fire burned half of Avalon's buildings, including six hotels and several clubs. In the face of huge debt related to the fire and the subsequent decline in tourism due to World War I, the Banning brothers were forced to sell the island in shares in 1919. On May 10, 1912 Glenn L. Martin flew a homemade seaplane in to Avalon, setting records for distance and time. In 1917 the Meteor Company purchased the Chinese pirate ship Ning Po, the oldest pirate ship afloat, built in 1753, and towed her to the Isthmus of Catalina Island for use as a tourist attraction and restaurant, until destroyed there by fire in 1938.

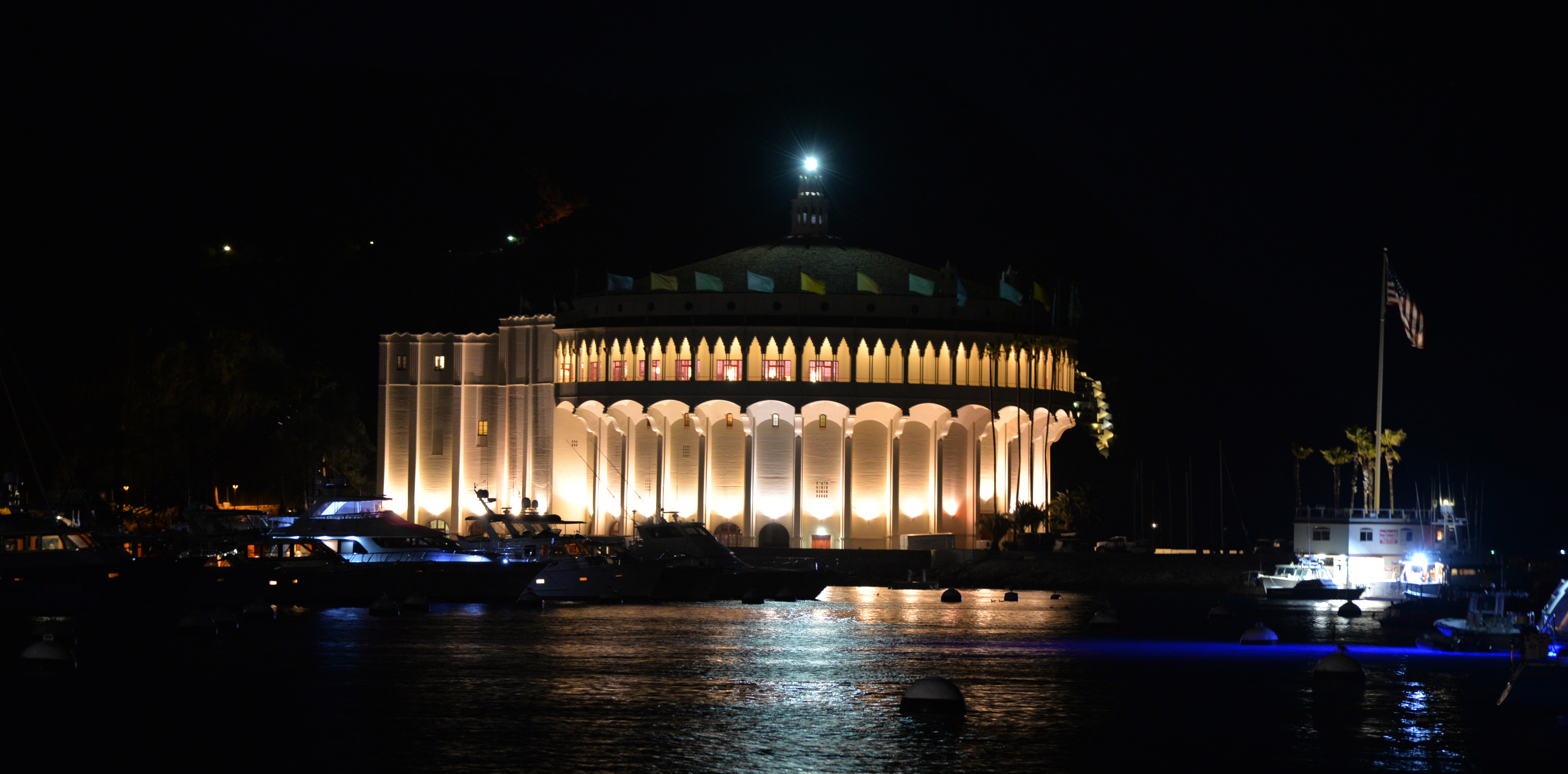
The Catalina Casino at night as it appeared in 2016

The Catalina Casino as it appeared in 2021

One of the main investors to purchase shares from the Bannings was chewing-gum magnate William Wrigley Jr. In 1919, Wrigley bought out nearly every share-holder until he owned controlling interest in the Santa Catalina Island Company. Wrigley invested millions in needed infrastructure and attractions to the island, including the construction of the Catalina Casino which opened on May 29, 1929. Wrigley also sought to bring publicity to the island through events and spectacles. Starting in 1921, the Chicago Cubs, also owned by Wrigley, used the island for the team's spring training. The Cubs continued to use the island for spring training until 1951, except during the war years of 1942 to 1945. Following the death of Wrigley Jr. in 1932, control of the Santa Catalina Island Company passed down to his son, Philip K. Wrigley, who continued his father's work improving the infrastructure of the island.

=== World War II ===
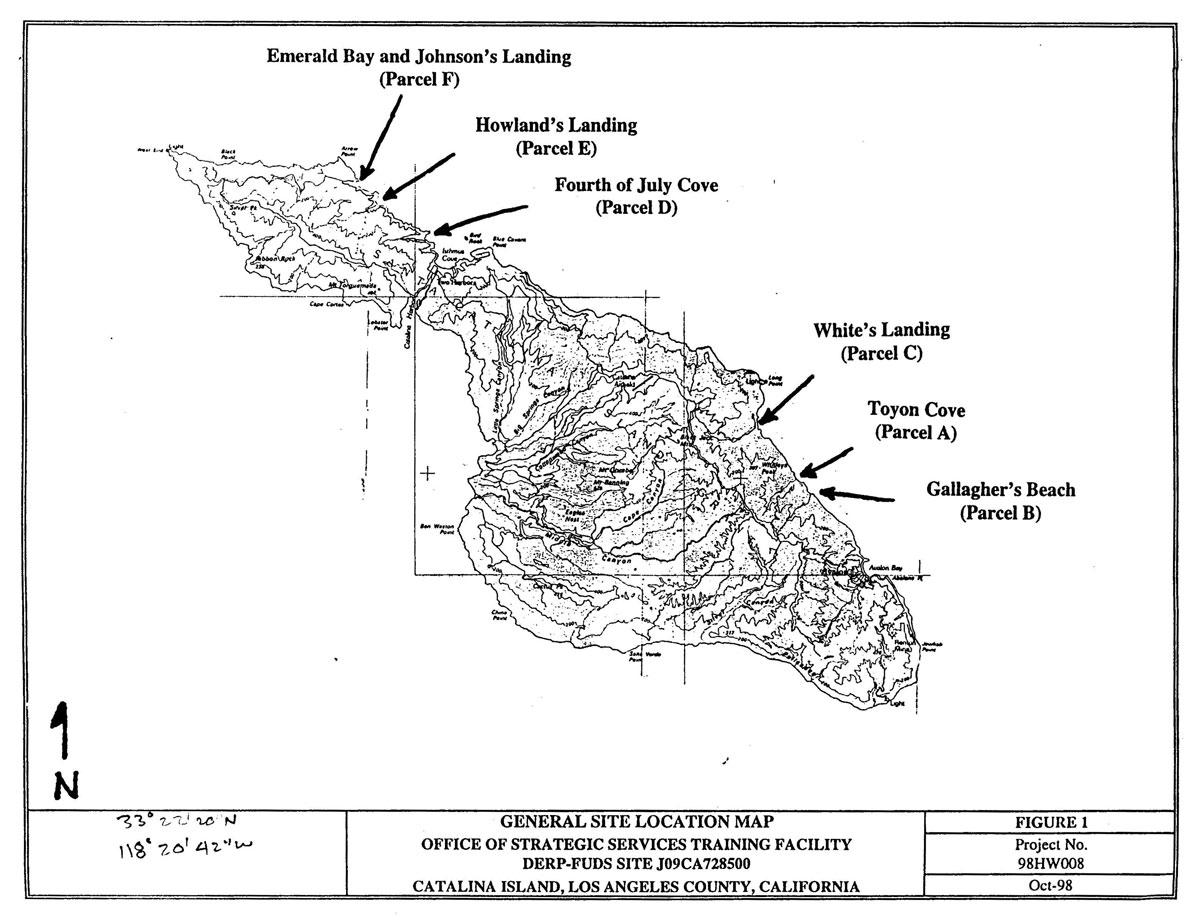
The OSS Maritime Unit (predecessor to the Navy SEALs and other US military frogmen programs) used several locations on the island as training grounds for amphibious assaults, diving, and other programs.

During World War II, the island was closed to tourists and used for military training facilities. Catalina's steamships were expropriated for use as troop transports and a number of military camps were established. The U.S. Maritime Service set up a training facility in Avalon, the Coast Guard had training at Two Harbors, the Army Signal Corps maintained a radar station in the interior, the Office of Strategic Services did training at Toyon Bay, and the Navy did underwater demolition training at Emerald Bay.

=== Post-war ===
In 1972, the Brown Berets, a group of Latino activists, Chicanos and Mexican residents occupied Santa Catalina Island, invoking the Treaty of Guadalupe Hidalgo, which has no mention of the islands. On February 15, 1975, Philip Wrigley deeded 42,135 acres (17,051 hectares) of the island from the Santa Catalina Island Company to the Catalina Island Conservancy that he had helped to establish in 1972. This gave the Conservancy control of nearly 90 percent of the island. The balance of the Santa Catalina Island Company that was not deeded to the Conservancy maintains control of much of its resort properties and operations on the island.

Actress Natalie Wood drowned in the waters near the settlement of Two Harbors over the Thanksgiving holiday weekend in 1981 in what was ruled an accidental death. Wood and her husband, Robert Wagner, were vacationing aboard their motor yacht, Splendour, along with their guest, Christopher Walken, and Splendour's captain, Dennis Davern. As a result of statements by Davern, and other factors, Wood's death certificate was altered to indicate the cause was "drowning and other undetermined factors"

In May 2007, the Island Fire was a large wildfire in the island. Largely due to the assistance of 200 Los Angeles County fire fighters transported by U.S. Marine Corps helicopters and U.S. Navy hovercraft, only a few structures were destroyed, though 4,750 acres (1,922 hectares) of wildland were burned. In May 2011, another wildfire started near the Isthmus Yacht Club and was fought by 120 firefighters transported by barge from Los Angeles. It was extinguished the next day after burning 117 acres (47 ha).

== Geology ==
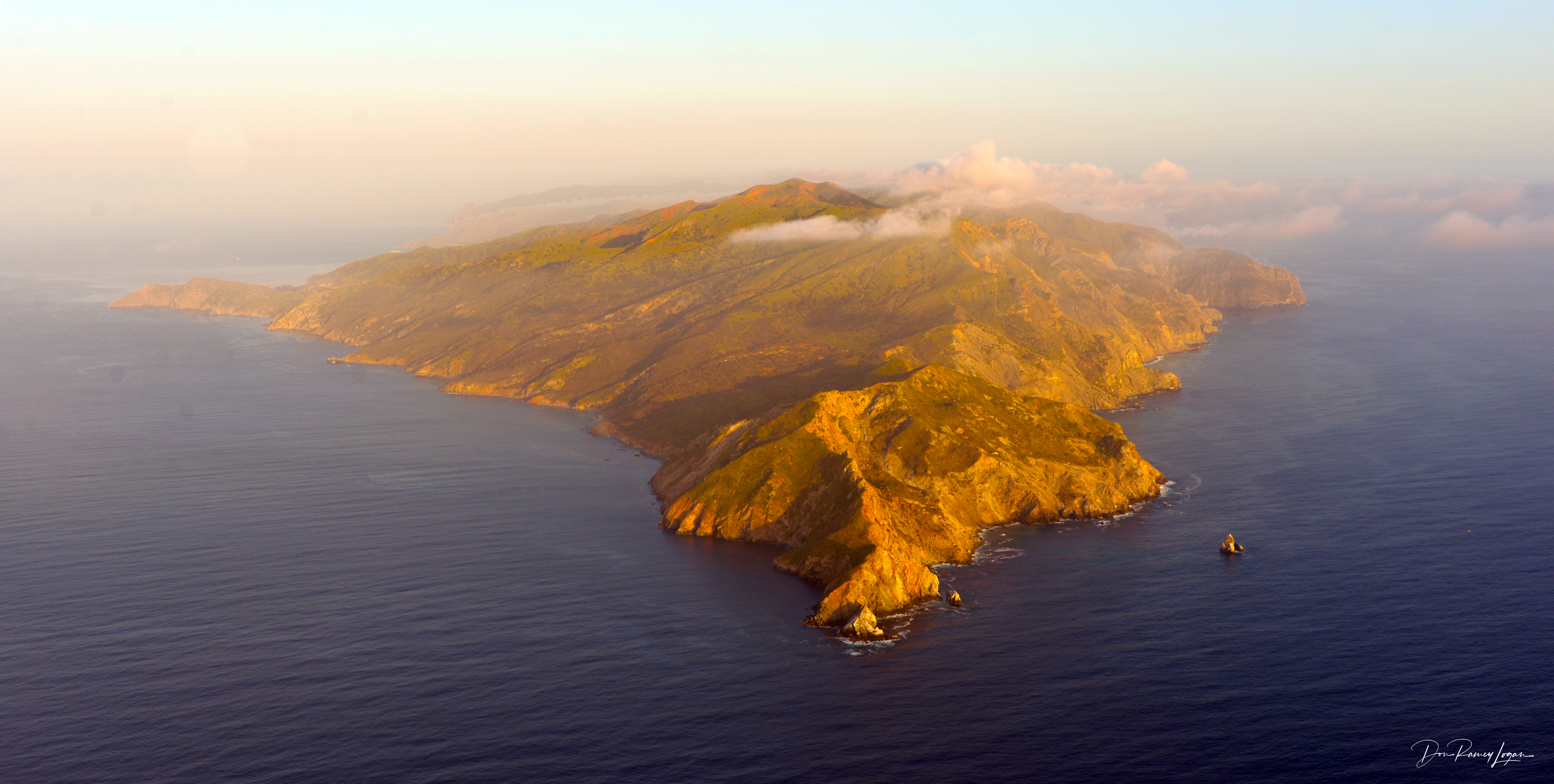
"Catalina Islands West End"

Catalina Island is a part of the Channel Islands of California, which are a chain of eight islands located in the Pacific Ocean off the coast of Southern California. Catalina is primarily composed of two distinct rock units: Catalina Schist from the Early Cretaceous (95 to 109 million years ago), and Miocene volcanic and intrusive igneous rocks; there are also scattered deposits of sedimentary rocks.

Sunset over Catalina Island

The island is rich in quartz, to the extent that some beaches on the seaward side have silvery-grey sand. These deposits provide insights into the island's history, as they contain fossils of ancient marine life. The island is situated along the boundary of two tectonic plates: the Pacific Plate and the North American Plate. This boundary is marked by the San Andreas Fault and the East Pacific Rise. The islands in this region have been shaped by tectonic uplift and volcanic activity. This means that the Santa Catalina Island land-mass was never directly connected to mainland California. Other geologic factors that contributed to the island topography include further geologic uplift and subsidence, tectonic plate movement, sedimentation, metamorphic activity, weathering, and erosion. The island's landscape is characterized by rugged terrain, including steep cliffs, canyons, and rolling hills. There are also geologic features such as sea caves and marine terraces along the coastline.

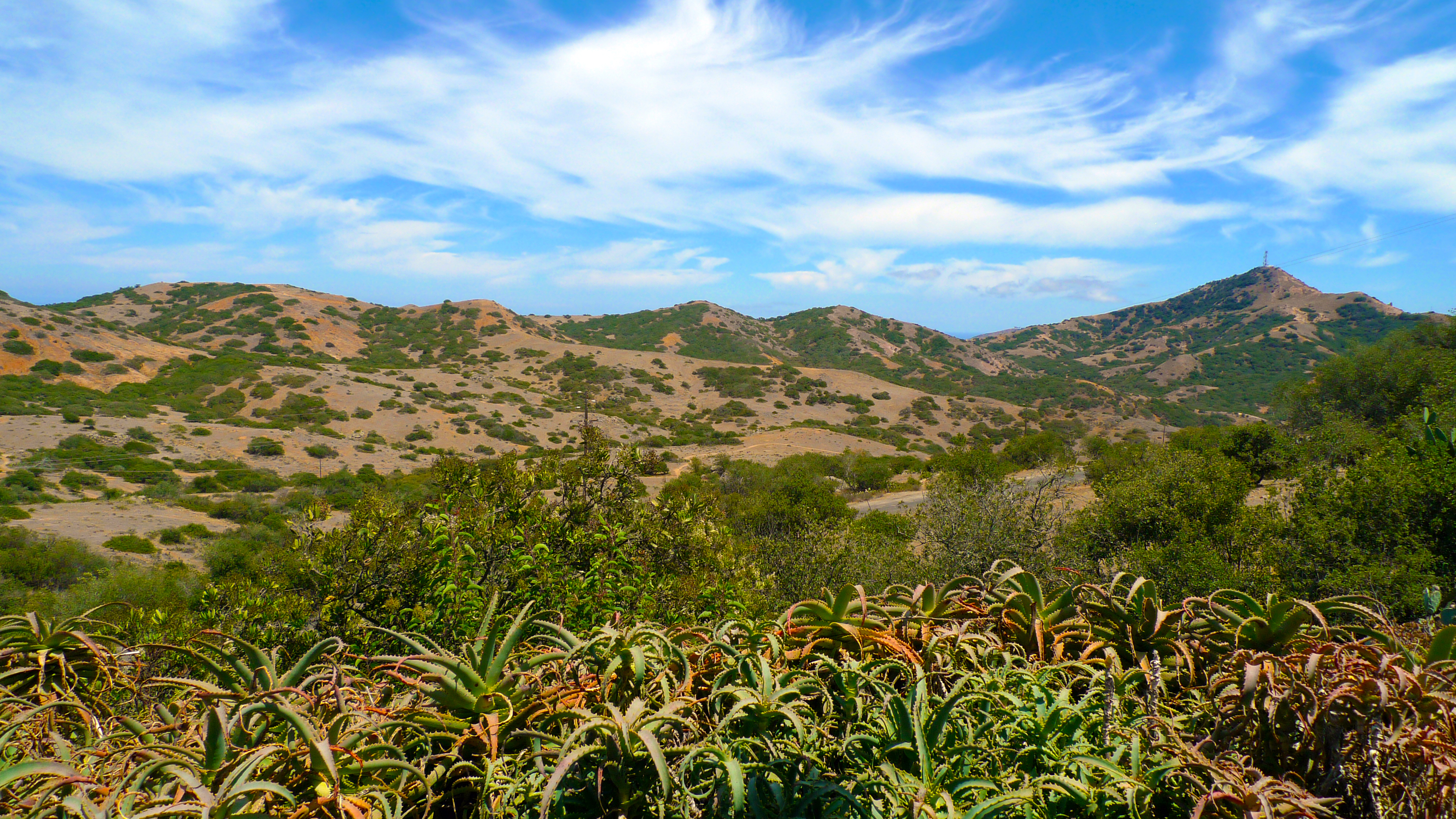
The Catalina Island interior is owned and maintained by the Catalina Island Conservancy

Catalina Island has been a site of interest for geologists and researchers studying island geology, as well as the processes of island formation, uplift, and erosion. The island's geology has also contributed to the understanding of tectonic plate interactions in the region. One of the most notable geological features on Catalina Island is the "Catalina Schist." This metamorphic rock is unique to the island and has been studied for its geologic significance. It is believed to be one of the oldest rocks on the island. The geology of Catalina Island is also important for conservation efforts. The Catalina Island Conservancy plays a role in protecting and managing the island's natural resources, including its geological formations.

=== Climate ===
Santa Catalina Island has a warm-summer Mediterranean climate (Köppen climate classification Csb) with very mild winters. The National Weather Service maintains cooperative weather records at the Santa Catalina airport. The average January temperatures are a maximum of 58.4 °F (14.7 °C) and a minimum of 47.6 °F (8.7 °C). Average July temperatures are a maximum of 78.1 °F (25.6 °C) and a minimum of 60.0 °F (15.6 °C). There are an average of 12.5 days with highs of 90 °F (32 °C) or higher and an average of 0.3 days with lows of 32 °F (0 °C) or lower. The record high temperature was 105 °F (41 °C) on July 6, 2018, and the record low temperature was 29 °F (−2 °C) on January 11, 1949. Coastal high fog is common during summer, but usually burns off by the afternoon.

Average annual precipitation at the airport is 13.73 inches (34.9 cm); the highest mountain peaks get up to 17 inches (43 cm) per year. There are an average of 45 days with measurable precipitation. The wettest year was 1952 with 21.74 inches (55.2 cm) and the driest year was 1964 with 5.53 inches (14.0 cm). The most precipitation in one month was 7.81 inches (19.8 cm) in January 1952. The most precipitation in 24 hours was 2.95 inches (7.5 cm) on December 5, 1966. Snowfall is a rarity on the island, averaging only 0.4 inches (1.0 cm) a year at the airport at 1,602 feet above sea level, but 4.0 inches (10 cm) fell in 1949, including 3.0 inches (7.6 cm) in January.

Climate data for Santa Catalina WB Airport, California (1981–2010, extremes 1948–present)
Month	Jan	Feb	Mar	Apr	May	Jun	Jul	Aug	Sep	Oct	Nov	Dec	Year
Record high °F (°C)	85 (29)	87 (31)	90 (32)	92 (33)	96 (36)	101 (38)	100 (38)	103 (39)	104 (40)	98 (37)	89 (32)	81 (27)	104 (40)
Mean daily maximum °F (°C)	60.4 (15.8)	60.2 (15.7)	61.2 (16.2)	62.5 (16.9)	65.6 (18.7)	69.1 (20.6)	75.4 (24.1)	77.6 (25.3)	75.4 (24.1)	71.7 (22.1)	64.8 (18.2)	59.3 (15.2)	67.0 (19.4)
Daily mean °F (°C)	55.0 (12.8)	54.2 (12.3)	54.9 (12.7)	55.7 (13.2)	58.9 (14.9)	61.7 (16.5)	67.4 (19.7)	69.7 (20.9)	68.5 (20.3)	64.7 (18.2)	58.9 (14.9)	53.9 (12.2)	60.3 (15.7)
Mean daily minimum °F (°C)	49.5 (9.7)	48.2 (9.0)	48.5 (9.2)	48.9 (9.4)	52.1 (11.2)	54.3 (12.4)	59.5 (15.3)	61.7 (16.5)	61.5 (16.4)	57.7 (14.3)	53.0 (11.7)	48.6 (9.2)	53.7 (12.1)
Record low °F (°C)	29 (−2)	32 (0)	36 (2)	39 (4)	43 (6)	45 (7)	49 (9)	50 (10)	48 (9)	41 (5)	37 (3)	34 (1)	29 (−2)
Average precipitation inches (mm)	2.83 (72)	3.06 (78)	2.05 (52)	0.71 (18)	0.21 (5.3)	0.22 (5.6)	0.06 (1.5)	0.05 (1.3)	0.21 (5.3)	0.64 (16)	1.23 (31)	2.46 (62)	13.73 (348)
Source: NOAA

== Wildlife ==
Since Catalina Island was never connected to mainland California, it originally lacked any terrestrial life. Any plants or animals that arrived on the island had to make their way across miles of open ocean. The original species to come to the island arrived by chance by blowing over on the wind, drifting or swimming over the ocean, or flown over by wing. Starting with the Native Americans, animals and plants have also been introduced by humans, both intentionally and accidentally.

Catalina is home to at least fifty endemic species and subspecies that occur naturally on the island and nowhere else in the world. This limited distribution of a species may result from the extinction of the original population on the mainland combined with its continued survival on the island where there may be fewer threats to its continued existence.

=== Flora ===
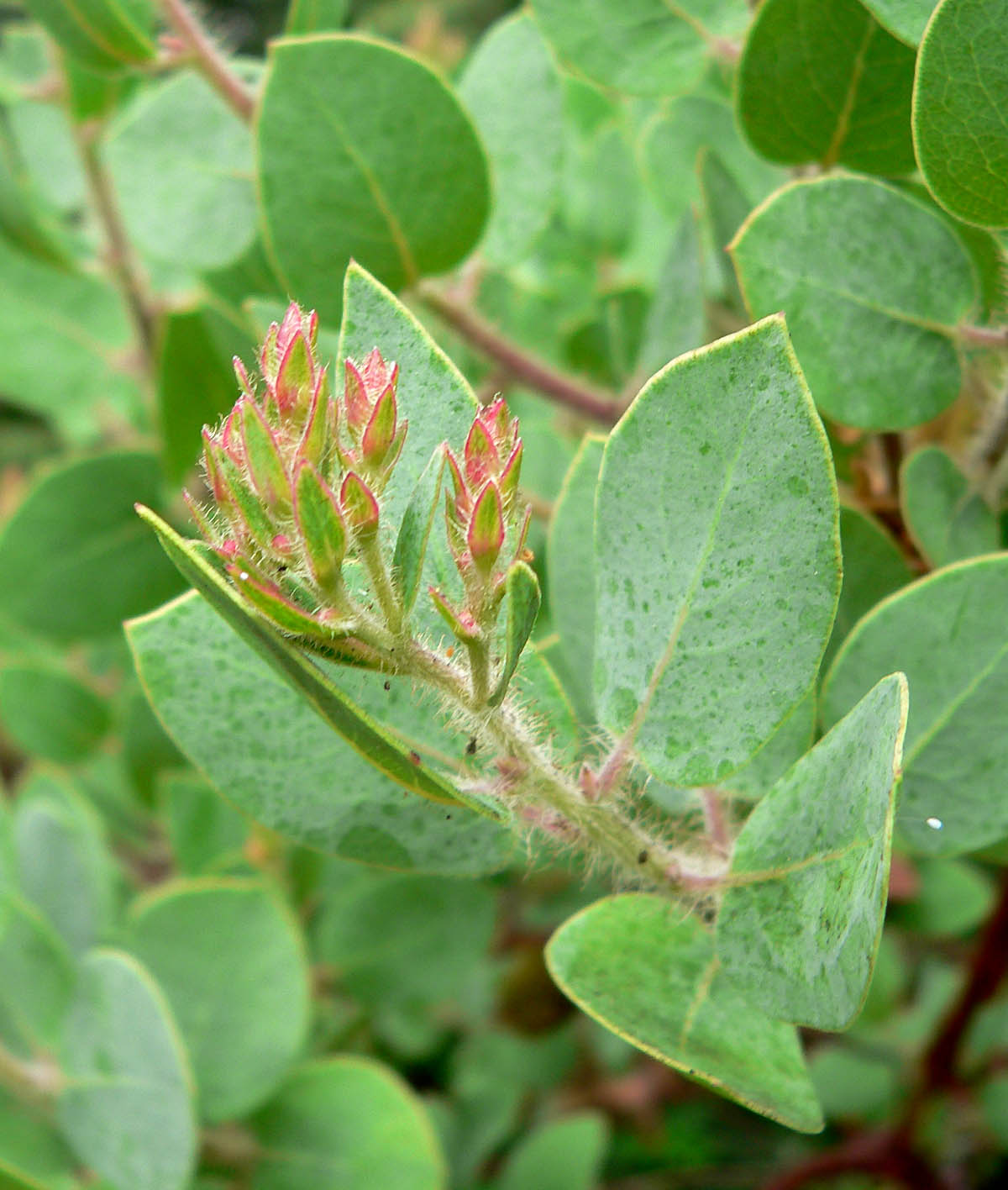
Catalina manzanita, one of the island's endemic plants

The most common native plant communities of Catalina Island are chaparral, coastal sage scrub, island oak-ironwood woodland, and grassland.

Catalina Island is home to approximately 400 species of native plants. Six species, subspecies or varieties are endemic and can only be found on the island. These endemics include the Catalina manzanita (Arctostaphylos catalinae); Catalina mahogany (Cercocarpus traskiae); Catalina dudleya (Dudleya hassei); St. Catherine's lace (Eriogonum giganteum var. giganteum); Santa Catalina bedstraw (Galium catalinense ssp. catalinense); and Santa Catalina Island ironwood (Lyonothamnus floribundus ssp. floribundus). A disjunctive population of toyon var. macrocarpa is also endemic to Santa Catalina Island. The Wrigley Memorial & Botanical Gardens emphasize endemic plants of the island. Many species of native plant life, including some endemic species, declined or went extinct after the introduction of grazing animals in the 19th century.

In addition to native and endemic species, Catalina Island has been impacted by introduced species, which were introduced by human activities. Some of these introduced species, like eucalyptus trees, have become common on the island and can sometimes outcompete native flora. Conservation efforts, led by organizations such as the Catalina Island Conservancy, aim to manage and control invasive species to protect the native ecosystem. Catalina Island has also been a focal point for botanical research, attracting botanists and researchers who study the island's unique plant species. These studies contribute to our understanding of plant adaptation, island ecology, and conservation.

=== Fauna ===
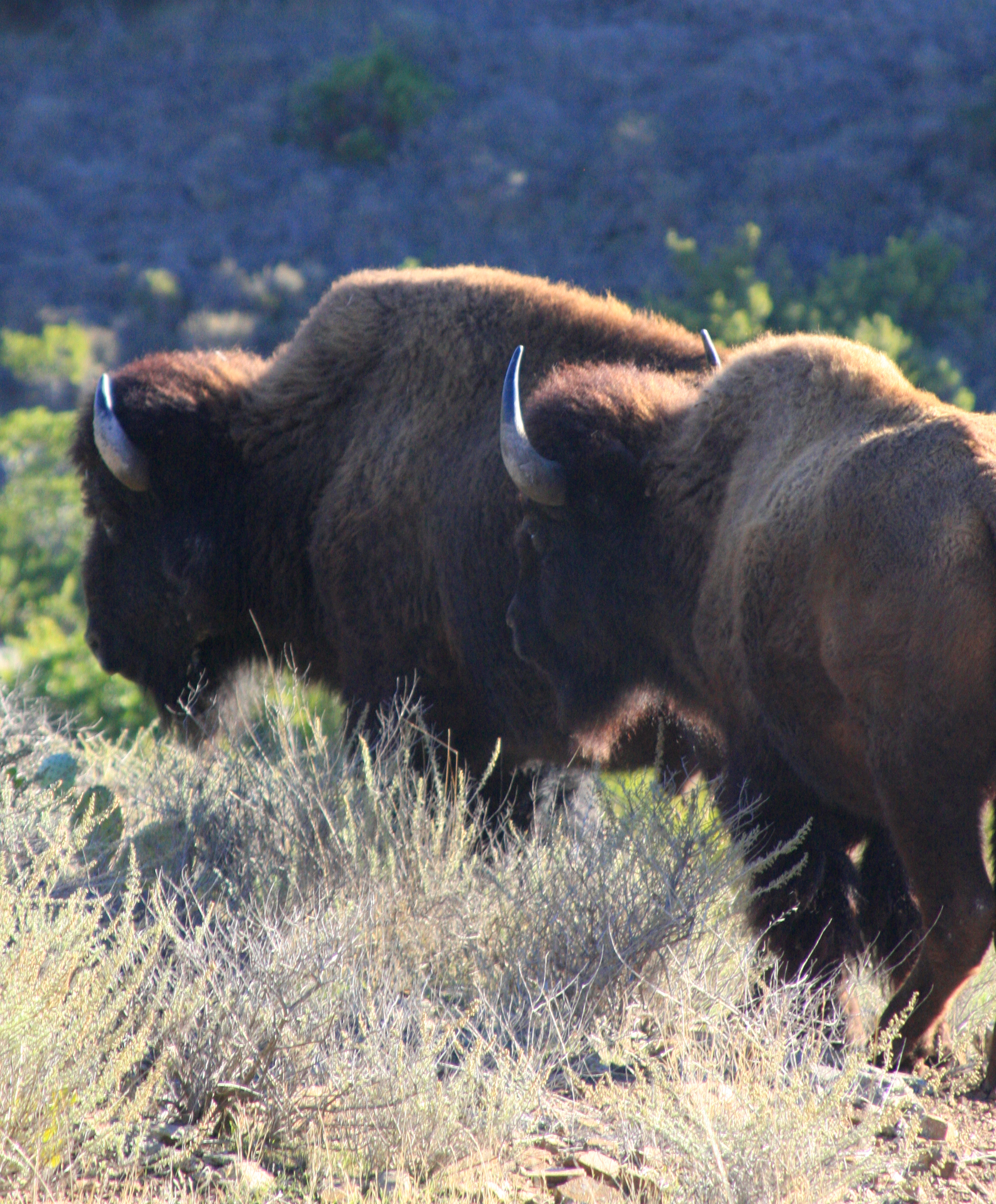
Bison on Catalina Island

The island is home to five native land mammals: the island fox, the Spermophilus beecheyi nesioticus subspecies of California ground squirrel, the Santa Catalina Island harvest mouse (Reithrodontomys megalotis catalinae), the Santa Catalina Island deer mouse (Peromyscus maniculatus catalinae), and the ornate shrew (Sorex ornatus). Only one ornate shrew was ever found, from a now-developed spring area above Avalon. Shrews are difficult to capture and may survive in wetter areas of the island.

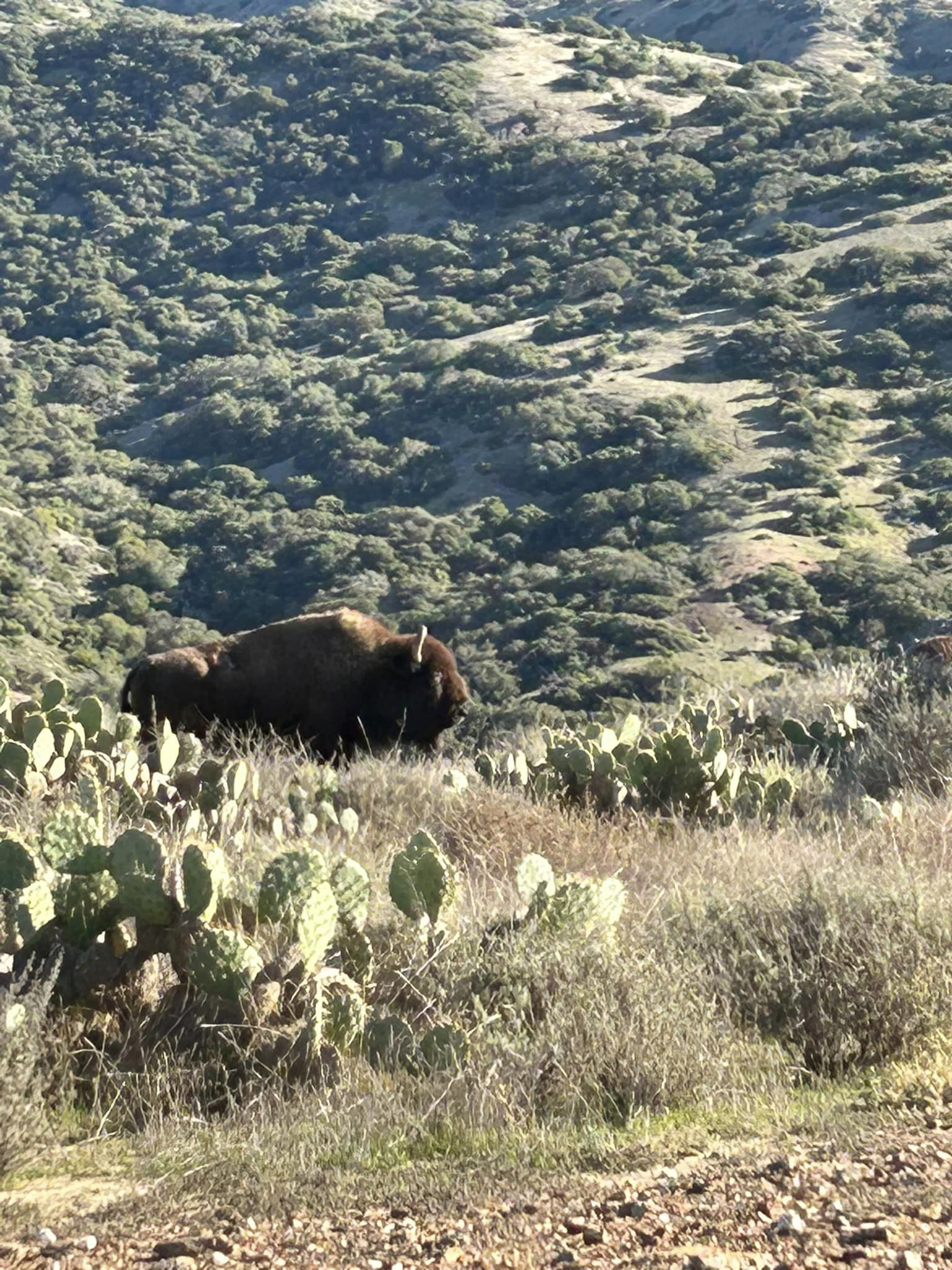
One of the approximately 100 bison in Catalina Island

The Catalina orangetip butterfly is a notable insect on the island. An endemic dwarf subspecies of the Southern Pacific rattlesnake (Crotalus oreganus helleri) that is more aggressive and more venomous than typical members of that species, is also present on the island. This subspecies should not be confused with the Santa Catalina rattlesnake, found on Santa Catalina Island, Mexico.

The Catalina Island bison herd consists of American Plains Bison maintained and monitored by the Catalina Island Conservancy. In the 1920s to 1930s, several bison were brought onto Catalina Island for a movie. The bison are popular with the tourists and buildings have painted images of bison and bison weather vanes. Over the decades, the bison herd grew to as many as 600. The population numbered approximately 150 in 2009. Then, as of 2025, due to birth control programs the herd is no longer reproducing, and in about 20 to 40 years, the American bison will disappear from Catalina Island.

Other non-native animals currently living on the island include the bullfrog, feral cat, California mule deer, Norway rat, European starling, and a herd of 12 Blackbuck from India that currently live at the lower end of the cottonwood canyon near the island's airport. Mule deer were introduced to the island in the 1920s, and currently have a population density roughly 10 times that of California generally. The island was also previously home to populations of cattle, feral goat, feral pig, and sheep, but these animals are no longer present.

According to the Catalina Island Conservancy, there are 37 resident bird species on the island. Considerably more marine, pelagic, and migrating birds frequent the island, and 127 species have been reported to the Cornell University eBird database from 10 different eBird hotspots. There are several live camera feeds showing bald eagle nests on the island; nests are active February–July.

In the waters surrounding the island, there are schools of fish like Garibaldi, California sheephead, leopard sharks, white seabass, yellowtail, bat rays, giant sea bass, and many more. Great white sharks are also occasionally found or caught off the coast of Catalina, though usually around seal rookeries and not around inhabited areas. Common marine mammals around Catalina include California sea lions and harbor seals.

The Catalina macaw, a type of hybrid parrot, was first bred at Catalina Bird Park in 1940 and is named after Santa Catalina Island.

=== Conservation ===
Most of the island is managed by the Catalina Island Conservancy, a private nonprofit organization. The mission of the Catalina Island Conservancy is to be a steward of its lands through a balance of conservation, education and recreation. The Conservancy protects the natural and cultural heritage of Santa Catalina Island, stewarding approximately 42,000 acres (170 km^{2}) of land (88 percent of the island), 50 mi (80 km) of shoreline, an airport, and more than 200 mi (320 km) of roads.

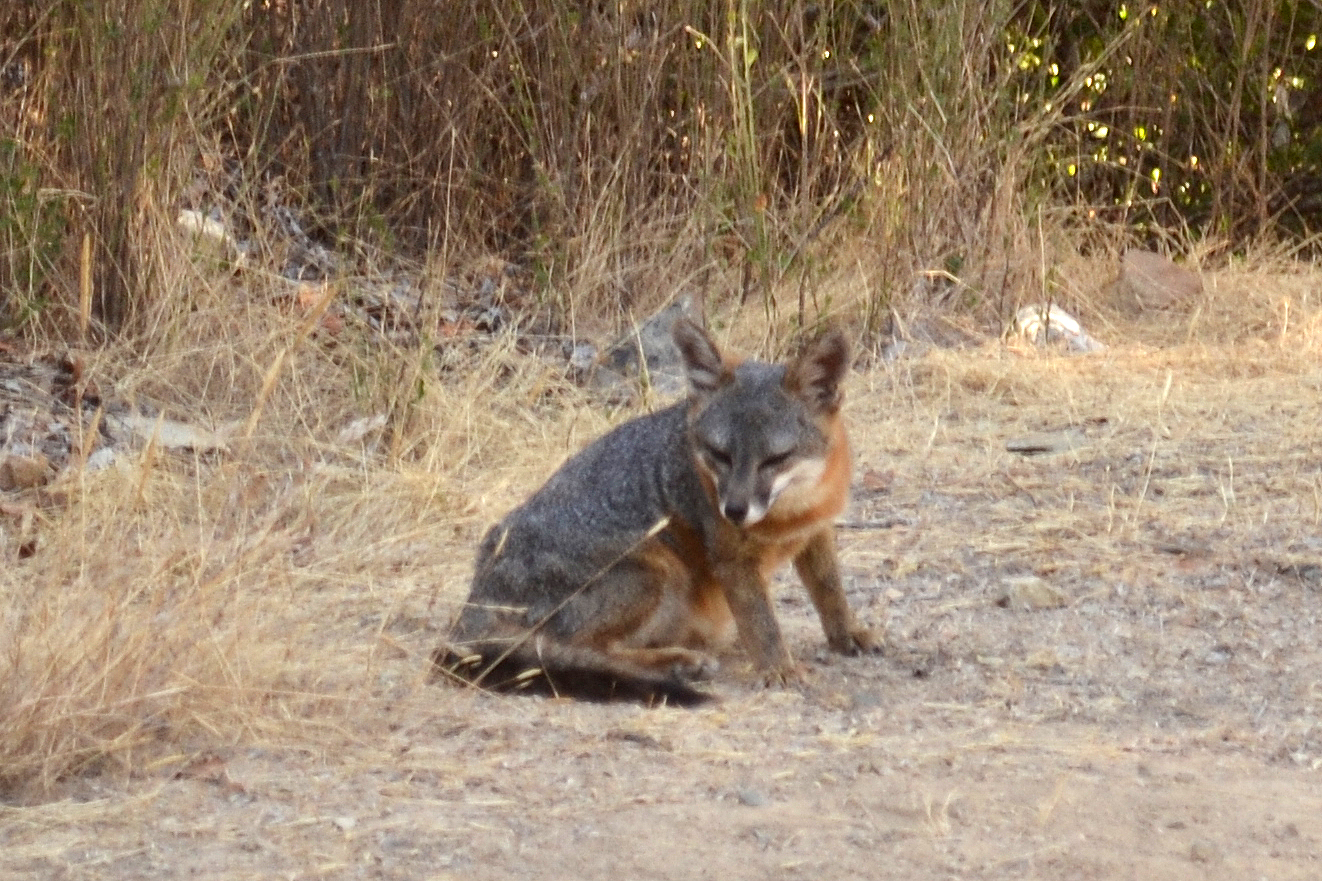
Catalina Island Fox (Urocyon littoralis catalinae) sitting on trail

One of the Conservancy's key goals is the conservation of the island fox, an endangered endemic species. In 1999, all but 100 out of 1,300 foxes on Catalina Island were wiped out because of a virulent strain of canine distemper. Following a successful recovery program which included captive breeding, distemper vaccinations and population monitoring, the Catalina fox community has been restored to more than 1570 in 2018. However, mysterious, usually fatal ear tumors continue to plague the Catalina fox. Three Catalina Island Conservancy wildlife biologists continue to monitor the population through pit tagging, trapping and inspection. The conservancy group vaccinates around 300 foxes every year and monitors 50 unvaccinated foxes via radio collar to watch for signs of new disease outbreaks. The current leading cause of death among Island Foxes is road strikes; to combat this, the Conservancy installed new signage about Island Foxes. The Conservancy also introduced wild-life proof trash cans to protect foxes from human garbage, informs boaters about the possibility and danger of wildlife stowaways, and asks dog owners to keep their animals leashed.

The Institute for Wildlife Studies, a separate conservation organization, has worked to restore bald eagles to the island on Conservancy land since the late 1970s. Bald eagles had been common on the island until the 1960s, when it is believed that the effects of dumping the pesticide DDT off the coast of Southern California made it impossible for eagles to successfully hatch their young. The reintroduction of the bald eagle to the island may also edge out an invasive golden eagle population that threatens the native island fox.

== Tourism ==
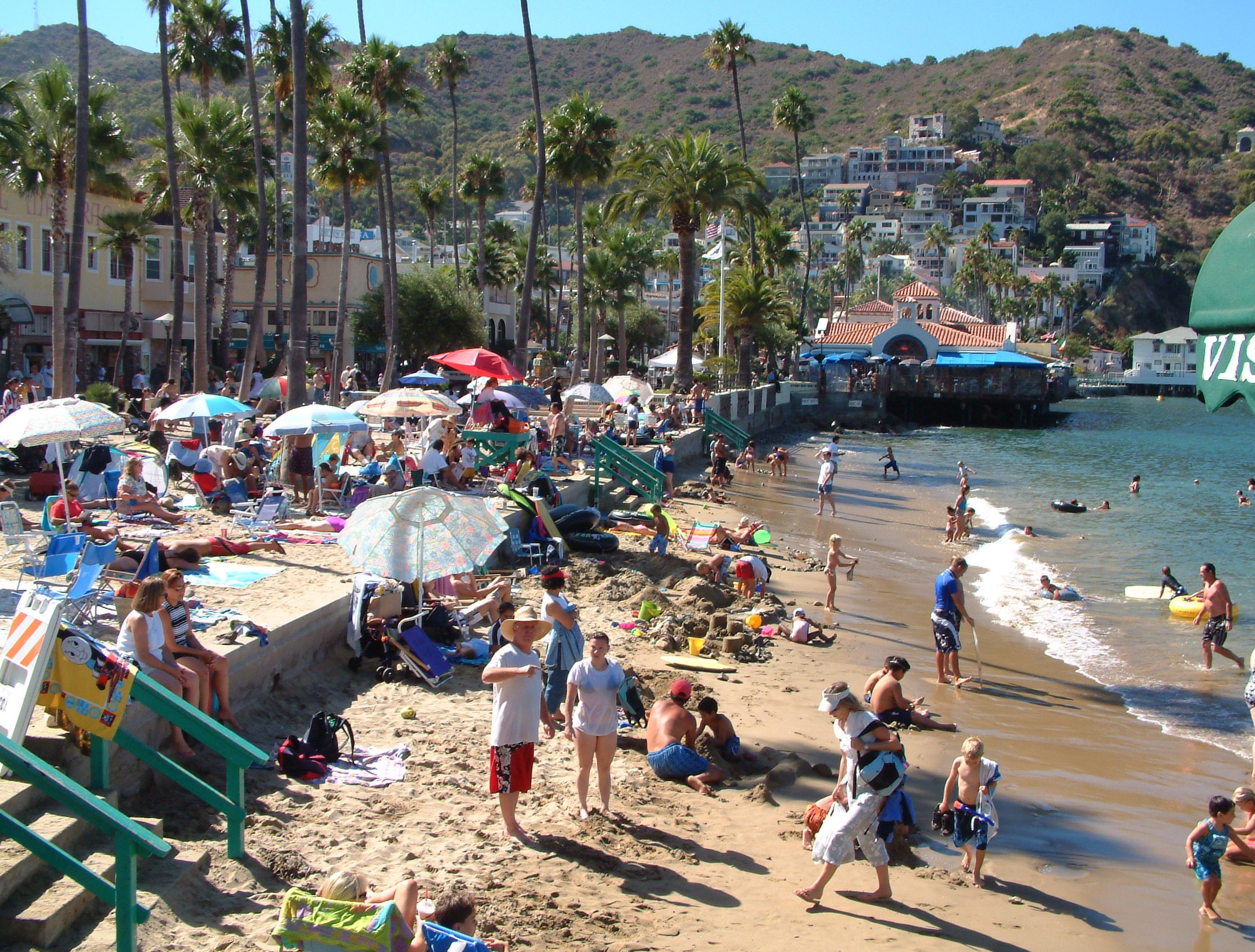
Avalon beach in summertime

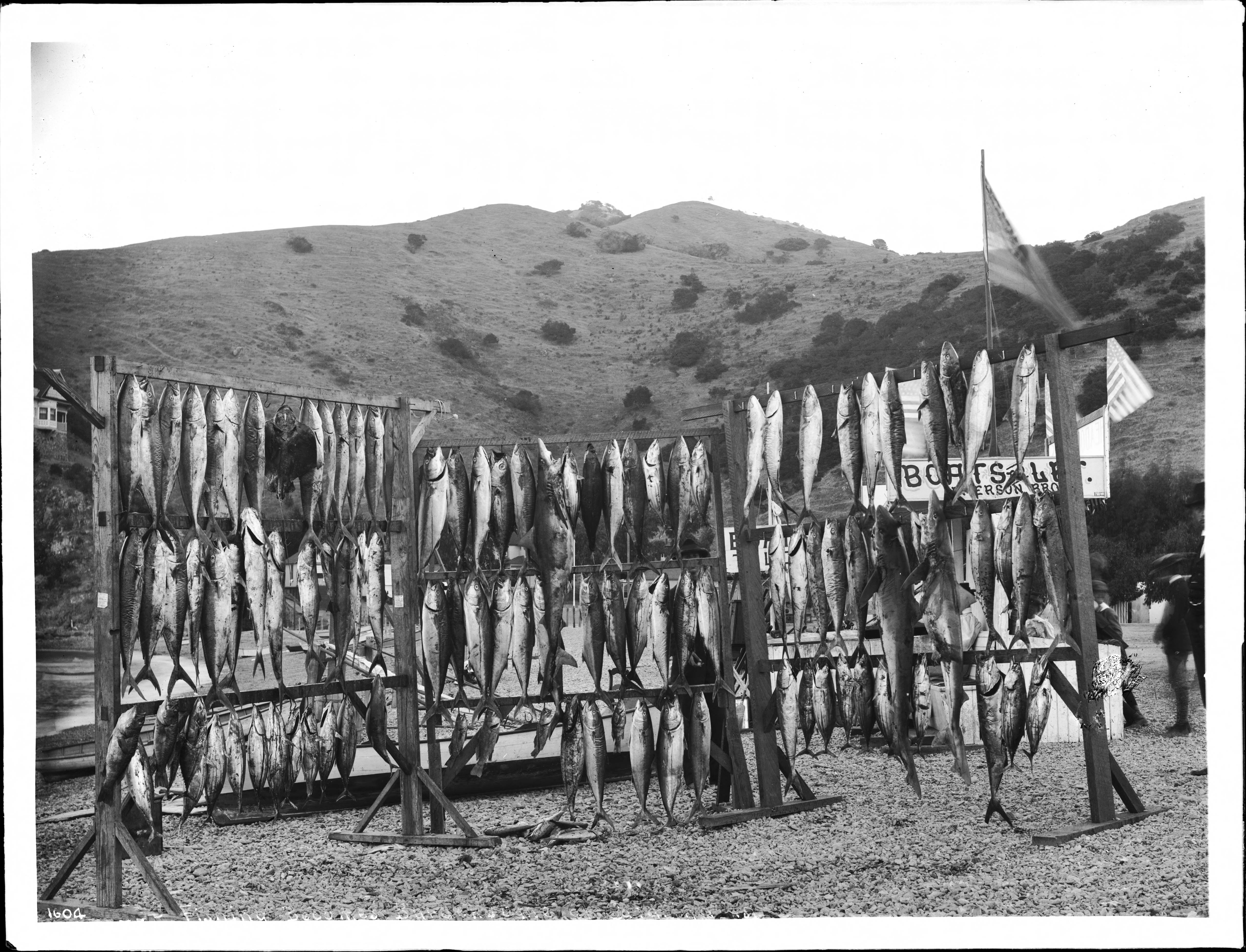
Fish catch at Santa Catalina Island, 1905. (CHS-1604) More than 100 fish caught off island on wooden racks. Part of sign reads "Boats for let."

Over one million people travel to Catalina Island every year, accounting for $166.7 million in annual direct spending on the Island.

Avalon is the island's largest population center and offers glass-bottom boat tours of the reefs and shipwrecks of the area, and scuba diving and snorkeling are popular in the clear water. Lover's Cove, to the east of Avalon, and Descanso Beach, to the west of the Casino, are popular places to dive. At Casino Point is the Avalon Underwater Dive Park, which was the first non-profit underwater park in the United States. The area flying fish and the bright orange Garibaldi are attractions. Parasailing is also offered. Jeep and bus tours are given of the interior, which is a conservation area managed by the Catalina Island Conservancy. The Love Catalina Island Tourism Authority operates the official island visitor center on the Green Pleasure Pier and provides visitor services assists tourists with any information on how to get to Catalina Island.

Avalon April 23, 2026

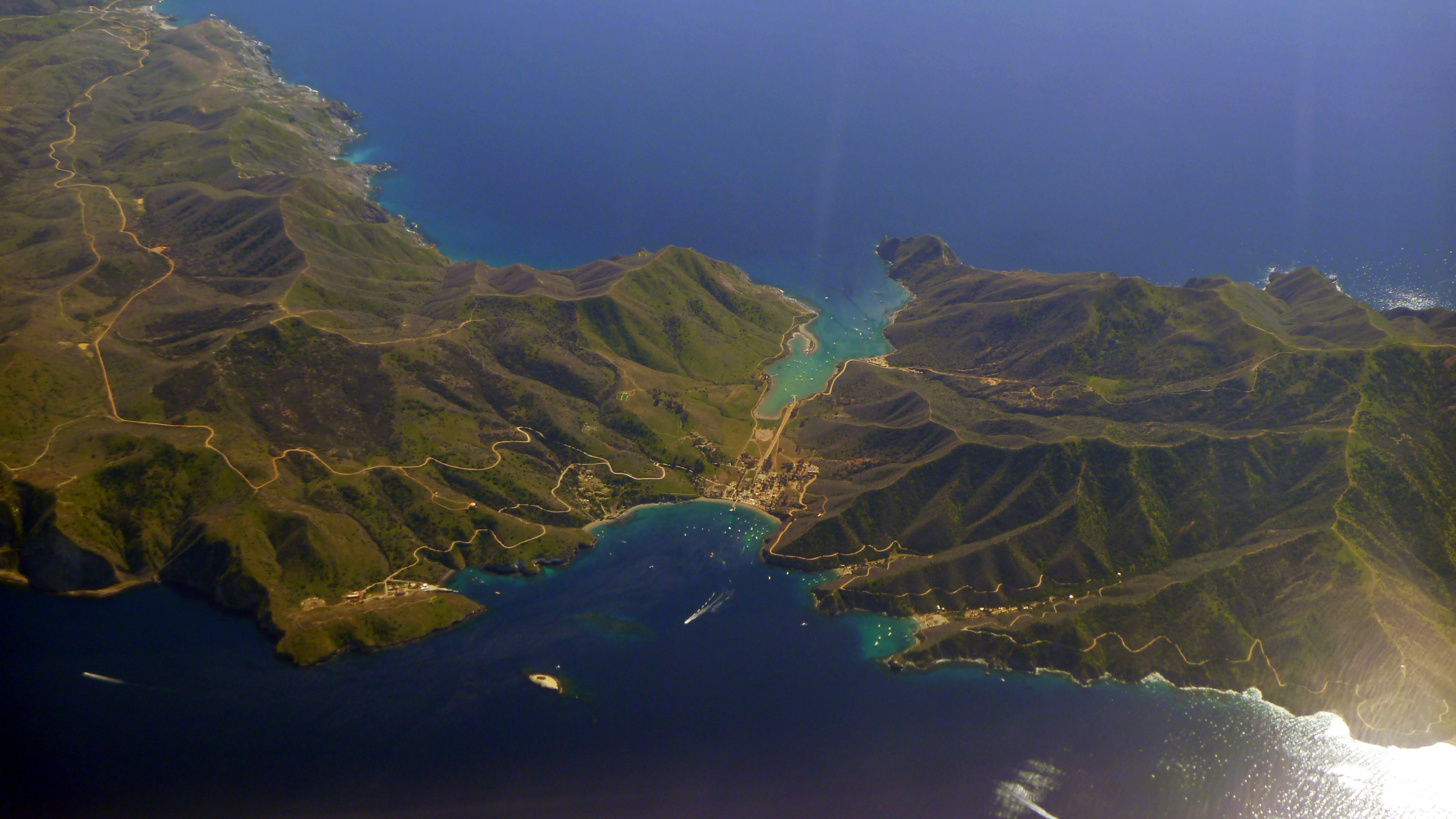
Two Harbors, the smaller of the island's two population centers, in 2015

Two Harbors is the second, and much smaller, resort village on the island. Located at the isthmus of the island, northwest of Avalon, it is the primary landing spot for those who wish to tour the western half of the island.

Cottonwood Beach, Little Harbor beach and Catalina Head in the distance

It is accessible by boat from San Pedro and by bus or boat from Avalon. While tourists rarely have an opportunity to surf, two beaches on the back side of Catalina offer good waves: Shark Harbor and Ben Weston Beach. There are also two camps, Catalina Island Camps and Camp Emerald Bay, on the northeastern end of the island that offer summer camps for children and Scouts.

The Catalina Island Museum, formerly located in the historic Catalina Casino but since 2016 in a standalone building, is also an attraction as it is the keeper of the island's cultural heritage with collections numbering over 100,000 items and including over 8,000 years of Native American history, over 10,000 photographs and images, a large collection of Catalina-made pottery and tiles, ship models, and much more. The museum features dynamic exhibits on this history, an art gallery, special exhibitions traveling from around the world, and a unique Museum Store. Programs include First Fridays at the Museum, an annual tour of the historic Tuna Club, a Holiday Symphony Concert, book signings, gallery talks, an annual silent film benefit and more. From 1927 until 1937, pottery and tiles were made on the island at the Catalina Clay Products Company, and these items are now highly sought-after collectibles.

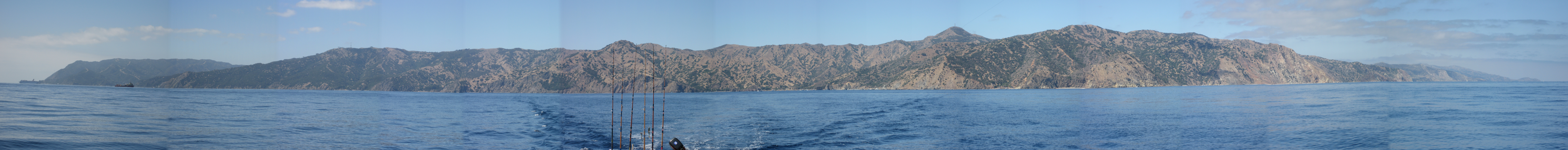
Catalina panorama, taken from a sail boat; Avalon is to the far left, Two Harbors to the mid-right.

== Education ==
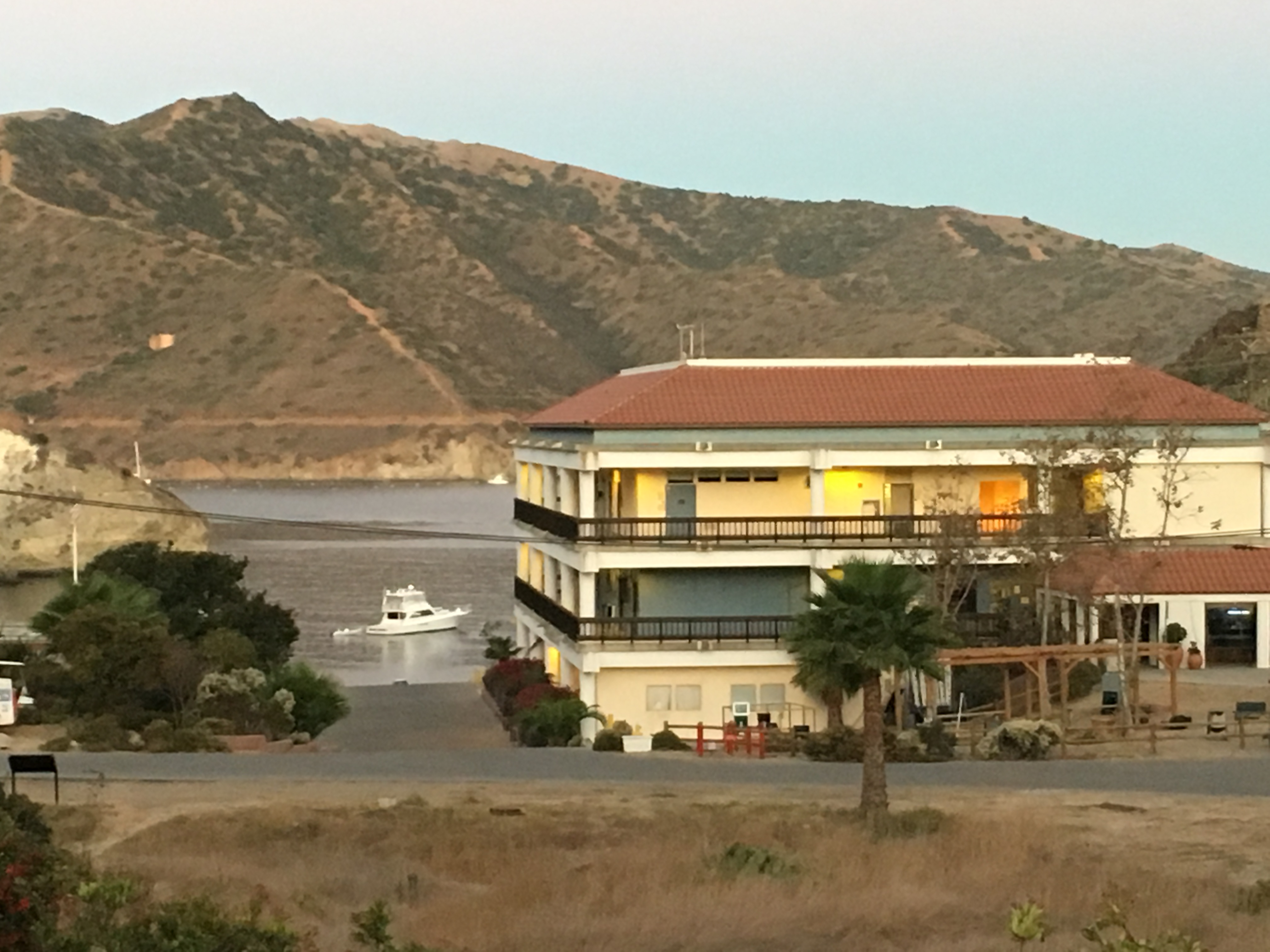
Sunrise view of the Wrigley Institute lab and Big Fisherman's Cove

Children in Avalon attend schools in the Long Beach Unified School District. There were two schools on Catalina Island. Two Harbors was served by a one-room school house, but it closed down in 2014; students must now travel to Avalon for all grades K–12. Avalon schools are housed on one main campus that includes Avalon Elementary School, Avalon Middle School and Avalon High School. Thousands of school-age youths travel from the mainland to study at the Catalina Island Marine Institute every year.

There is also a branch of the County of Los Angeles Public Library system in downtown Avalon, adjacent to the Sheriff's office.

The USC Wrigley Marine Science Center

The USC Wrigley Marine Science Center houses research and teaching facilities at Big Fisherman's Cove, near Two Harbors, for the USC Wrigley Institute for Environmental Studies. Maintained by the University of Southern California and named for Philip K. Wrigley, it consists of a 30,000-square-foot (3,000 m^{2}) laboratory building, dormitory housing, cafeteria, a hyperbaric chamber, and a large waterfront staging area complete with dock, pier, helipad, and diving lockers. The facility was expanded with a donation from the Wrigley family in 1995. The institute is open for public visits as part of its "Saturdays at the Lab" program.

== Sports ==
Catalina is the starting point for the Catalina Channel swim, the second jewel in the Triple Crown of Open Water Swimming, along with the English Channel, and Manhattan Island. In 1927, a 17-year-old Canadian swimmer, George Young, became the first person to complete a crossing from Catalina Island to the mainland of California in a time of 15:44.30. Since then, over 500 men and women have completed the 20.1 mile swim from Doctor's Cove on Catalina to the mainland near Point Vicente Lighthouse and Rancho Palos Verdes.

The Catalina Classic Paddleboard Race, initiated in 1955, is held every year in August. The 32 mile (51 kilometer) race starts at Catalina's Isthmus cove and ends at the Manhattan Beach Pier on the mainland. Competitors who complete the race and also complete the open ocean 32 mile Molokai to Oahu Paddleboard World Championships in Hawaii in the same summer are given a special classification of "Channel Masters".

The Annual Catalina Island Ski Race takes place in July as Skiers race from Long Beach to Catalina and back.

== Infrastructure ==
=== Transportation ===
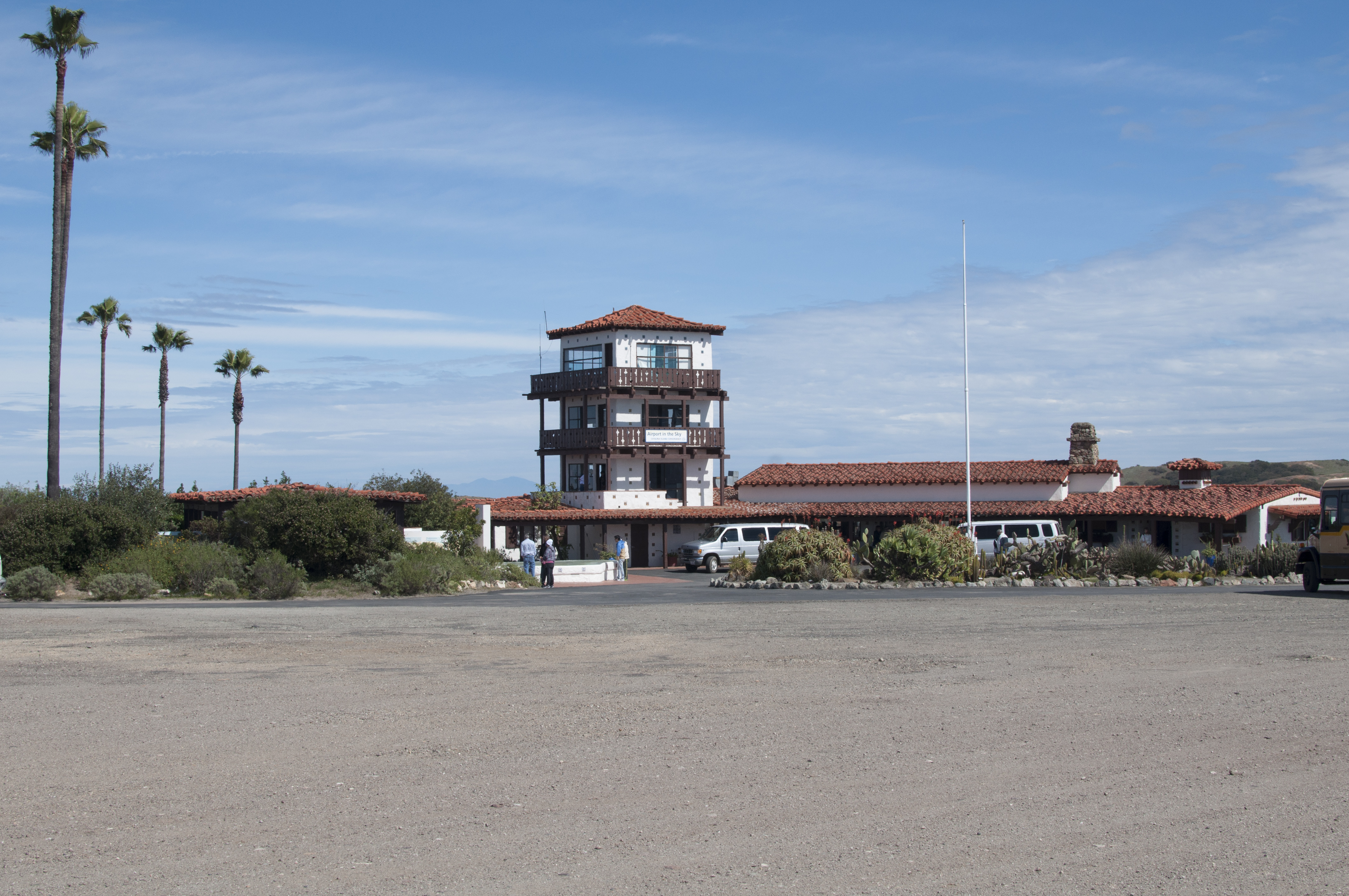
Catalina Airport, also known as the Airport-in-the-Sky

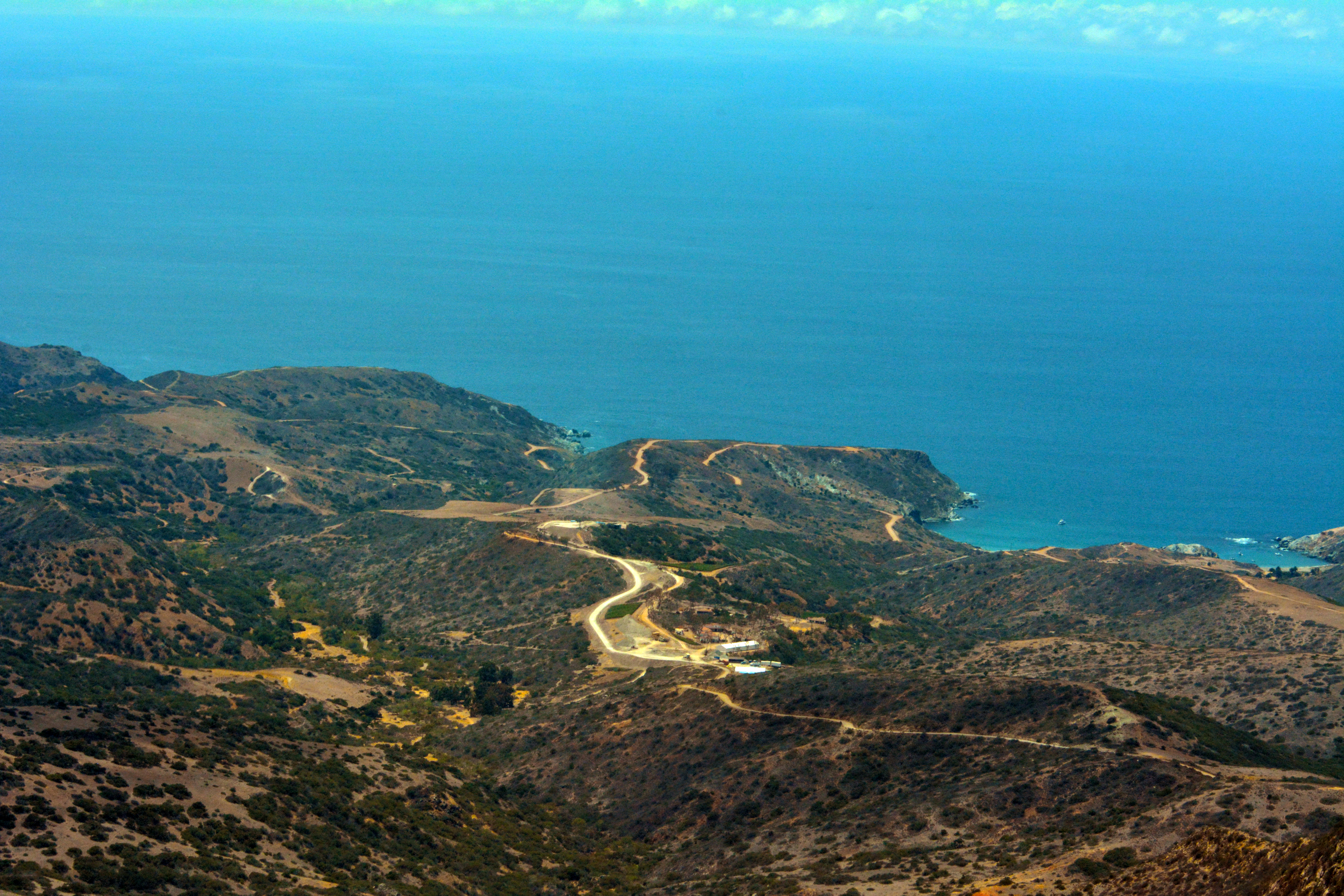
Little Harbor on the backside of Catalina

Cottonwood Beach, Little Harbor beach upon departure from Catalina Airport.

Catalina is serviced by passenger ferries operated by Catalina Express, Catalina Classic Cruises, and Catalina Flyer. Ferries depart from Long Beach and San Pedro in Los Angeles County as well as Dana Point and Newport Beach in Orange County. The ferry crossing takes just over an hour.

Helicopter service is also available from Long Beach or San Pedro.

Catalina has also been an active port of call for many cruise lines since the 1990s, with Royal Caribbean, Princess Cruises, and Carnival Cruise Lines making the port a regular stop on Baja cruises. The ships anchor about 1,000 feet off Avalon Harbor. Passengers disembark through shore boat tendering services.

The island is also home to the Catalina Airport (FAA Identifier: AVX), also known as Airport-in-the-Sky. The airport terminal was built in 1946 through the efforts of Dick Probert. The runway was built by Philip Wrigley in 1941, who leveled two adjacent hilltops and filled the canyon between them. It was called Buffalo Springs Airport, and was not opened for public use until 1946. By the 2000s the 3,000' (900m) runway was in serious disrepair, and arrangements were made in 2018 to have the Marines replace it with a concrete runway. The work was performed in January 2019, and the airport was returned to service on May 3. The airport is located 7 miles (11 km) northwest of Avalon. The runway is 1,602 feet (488 m) above sea level. Until the time of the airport's construction, the only scheduled passenger air service to the island was provided by seaplanes and helicopters at the Pebbly Beach Seaplane Base (FAA Identifier: L11).

The use of motor vehicles on the island is restricted; there is a limit on the number of full-sized vehicles, which translates into a 25-year-long wait list to bring a private car to the island. Most residents use golf carts or mini cars for transportation. Because of these restrictions, there is no vehicle ferry service. Tourists can hire a taxi from Catalina Transportation Services. Bicycles are also a popular mode of transportation. There are a number of bicycle and golf cart rental agencies on the island. Only the city of Avalon is open to the public without restrictions. The only major road into the back country is Stage Road. Under an agreement with Los Angeles County, the Conservancy has granted an easement to allow day hiking and mountain biking, but visitors must first obtain a permit at the Conservancy's office (on which they declare the parts of the island they intend to visit). Hiking permits are free, whereas bicycle permits are available for a fee.

=== Communication ===
Catalina's isolation offered good opportunities to experiment with new communication technologies throughout its history. The first of these communication innovations was the use of pigeons by Catalina's gold prospectors. Homing pigeons delivered messages to the mainland in 45 minutes, compared to 10 days to deliver mail from Isthmus to Wilmington by regular post in 1864. Even today, Avalon Post Office does not match the airmail service enjoyed by the miners. Pigeons were used to deliver messages for Catalina residents until 1899. By 1902, the first commercial wireless telegraph station was built in Avalon where the Chimes Tower now stands.

On July 16, 1920, the world's first commercial wireless radiotelephone toll circuit was opened to the public between San Pedro and Avalon. Designed by and installed under the direction of Western Electric Company/Bell Labs engineer Lewis M. Clement (1892–1979), the system drew other engineers from all over the world to study it. The Avalon telephone directory in 1920 listed 52 subscribers serviced by a manual switchboard. People stood for hours to use this new technology, the only drawback of which was that all conversations could be monitored by anyone listening to their radio. Pacific Telephone & Telegraph Co. solved that problem with the installation of two submarine cables running 23 miles (37 km) from Avalon to San Pedro in 1923. Another communication first touched Catalina when the world's first commercial microwave telephone system was installed in 1946. Although microwave telephones had been used for wartime applications, this was the first peacetime use of this technology.

Catalina's isolation also left the island as the last central office in the US Bell System to operate entirely using manual switchboard operators. The Catalina Island exchange was converted to dial in 1978. The island shares area code 310 and overlay area code 424 with parts of Ventura and Los Angeles County.

=== Emergency services ===
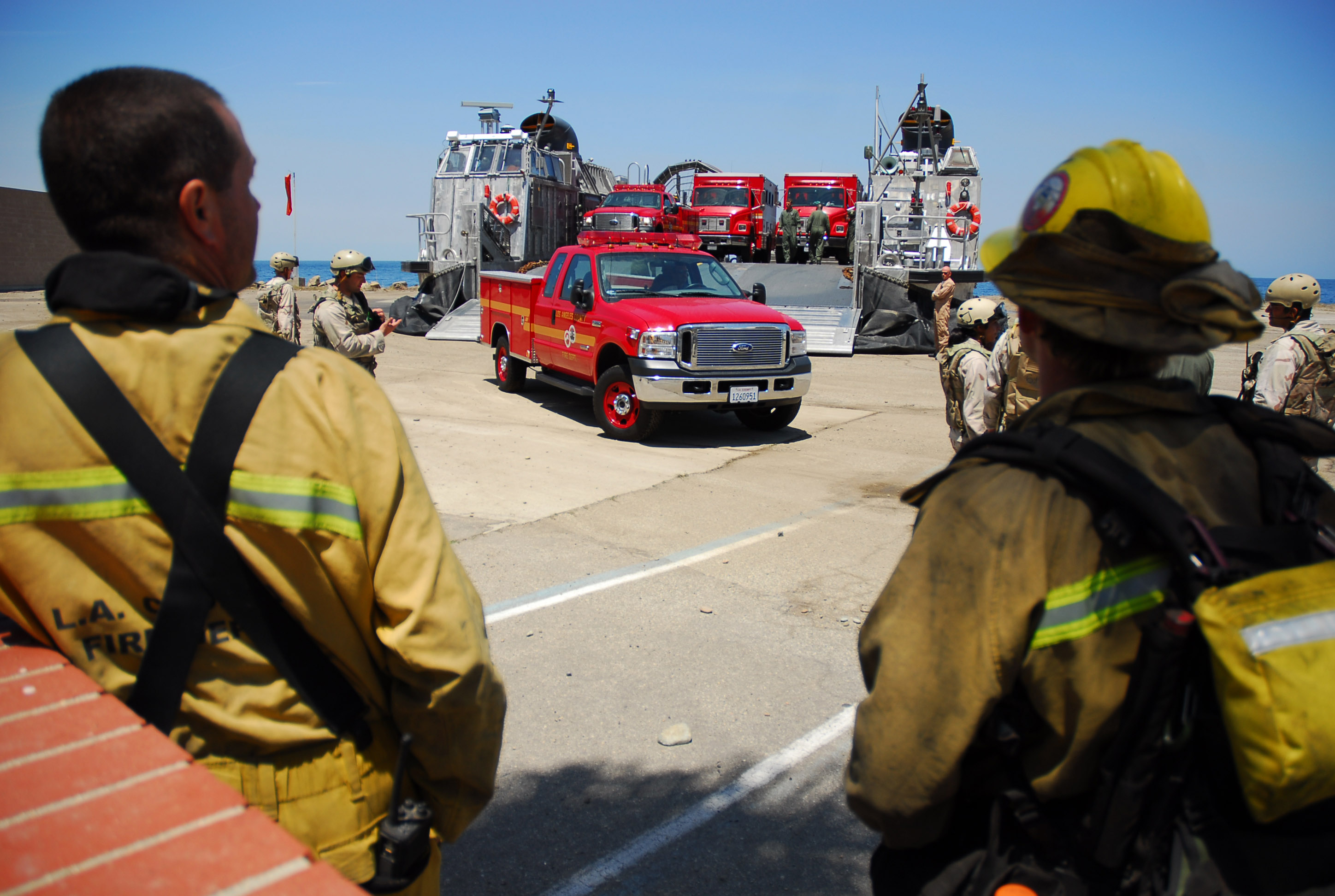
SANTA CATALINA ISLAND, Calif. (May 11, 2007) – Navy Assault Craft Unit (ACU) 5 assists Los Angeles County Fire Department in unloading their equipment from a Landing Craft Air Cushion (LCAC). The 4,000-acre wildfire forced evacuations.

The Los Angeles County Sheriff's Department (LASD) operates the Avalon Station serving Santa Catalina Island.

Fire Protection is provided by the Avalon Fire Department inside city limits, and by the Los Angeles County Fire Department in other areas of the island. Two county fire stations are located on Catalina Island: Station #55 is located just outside Avalon in Avalon Canyon and on-call firefighters staff Station #155 in Two Harbors.

Paramedic and lifeguard services are provided by the County Fire Department's Lifeguard Division, also known as Baywatch. Catalina Island Medical Center, located in Avalon, is the island's only hospital/medical center. It operates around the clock. Baywatch operates Baywatch Rescue/Lifeguard Boats.

=== Utilities ===
For decades the water was supplied primarily by a reservoir. Forty percent of drinking water on the island is provided by a desalination plant that opened in Avalon in 2016.

Avalon's sewer system was identified by researchers as the cause of ocean pollution in 2011. Many of the city's century-old clay and metal pipes had deteriorated to the point where they had vanished, allowing human sewage to enter into the bay. From 2000 to 2013, 11 out of 13 annual reports released by the Natural Resources Defense Council listed Avalon as one of the 10 most chronically polluted beaches in the nation for failing state health tests as much as 73% of the time. In February 2012, a cease and desist order was issued against the city for illegally discharging polluted water into the bay. The city invested $5.7 million on sewer main improvements and inspection and tracking systems. The 2014 report showed that water quality had improved, and Avalon Beach was removed from the list of the most polluted beaches.

Catalina's electric power is supplied by Southern California Edison's Pebbly Beach Generating Station. The plant has six diesel generators and 23 propane microturbines with a combined nameplate capacity of 9.4MW, supplemented by a 7.2MWh sodium-sulfur battery energy storage system.

== In popular culture ==
=== Film and television ===
In its heyday in the 1930s, due to its proximity to Hollywood, Catalina Island was a favored getaway destination for Hollywood stars such as Clark Gable. The island also served as a filming location for dozens of movies.

The 2008 movie Step Brothers features a so-called Catalina Wine Mixer event. While the scene in the movie was filmed at the Trump National Golf Club in Rancho Palos Verdes, the real island can be seen offshore in the background. The movie inspired a real-life Catalina Wine Mixer, hosted by the Catalina Island Company every year.

=== Video games ===
The island is mentioned in the 2020 action-adventure game The Last of Us Part II, and the Catalina Casino building features as the backdrop of the loading screen after the game is completed.

=== Music ===
In 1920, the song "Avalon", which directly references the town of Avalon on the island, was popularized by Al Jolson.

=== Computing ===
Apple's desktop operating system, macOS Catalina, announced on June 3, 2019, at WWDC, is named after this region.

== Notable people ==
- Spencer Davis, musician.
- Author Zane Grey built a home in Avalon, which serves as the Zane Grey Pueblo Hotel. Closed in 2011 for remodeling, it reopened in 2019.
- Gregory Harrison, actor, was born on Catalina Island.
- Marilyn Monroe lived with her first husband, James Dougherty, in the town of Avalon for several months in 1943.

== See also ==
- Farnsworth Onshore and Farnsworth Offshore State Marine Conservation Areas
- Cat Harbor State Marine Conservation Area
