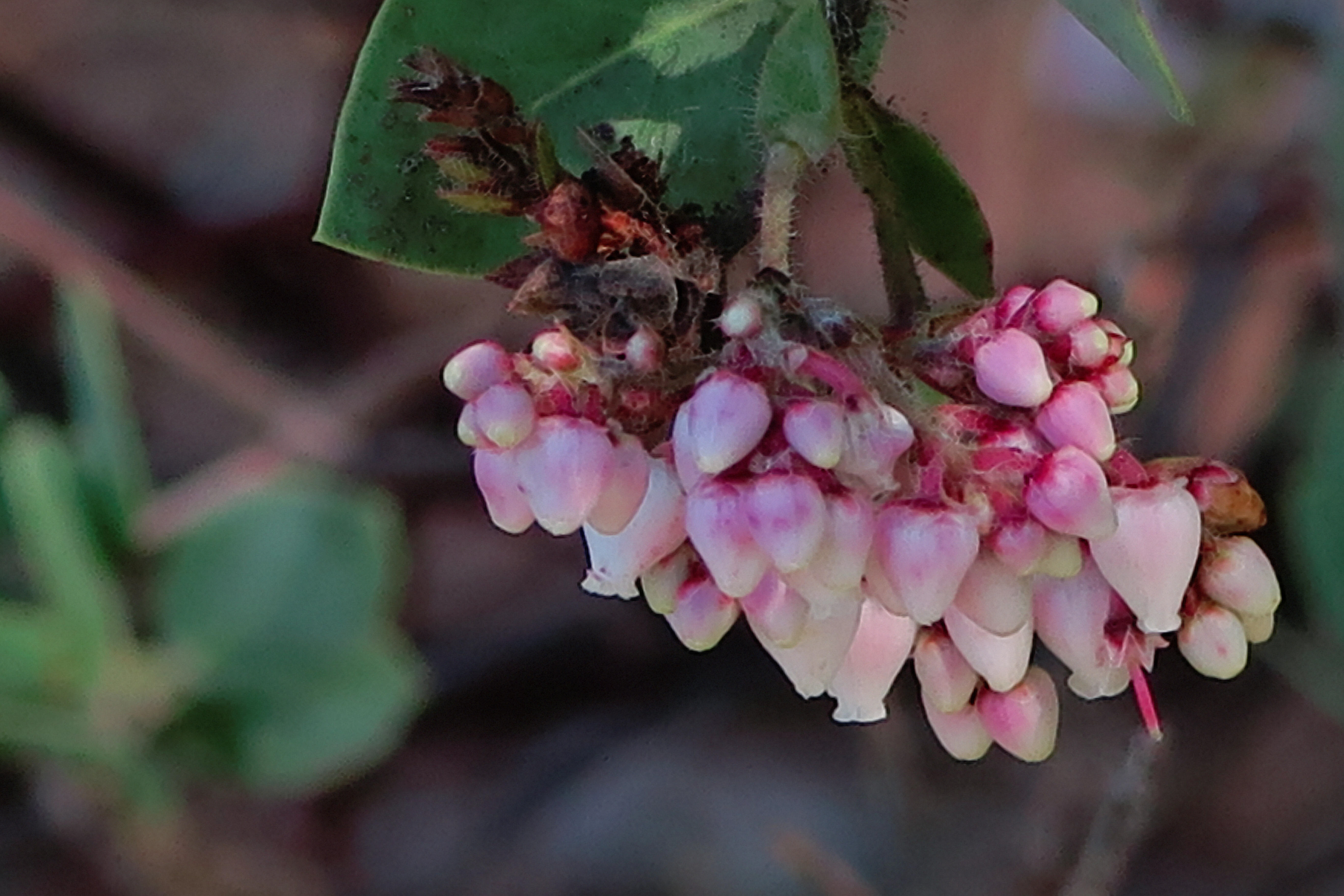

Conservation status
- Endangered (IUCN 3.1)

Scientific classification
- Kingdom: Plantae
- Clade: Tracheophytes
- Clade: Angiosperms
- Clade: Eudicots
- Clade: Asterids
- Order: Ericales
- Family: Ericaceae
- Genus: Arctostaphylos
- Species: A. catalinae

Binomial name
- Arctostaphylos catalinae P.V. Wells

= Arctostaphylos catalinae =

Santa Catalina Island manzanita

Species of manzanita plant

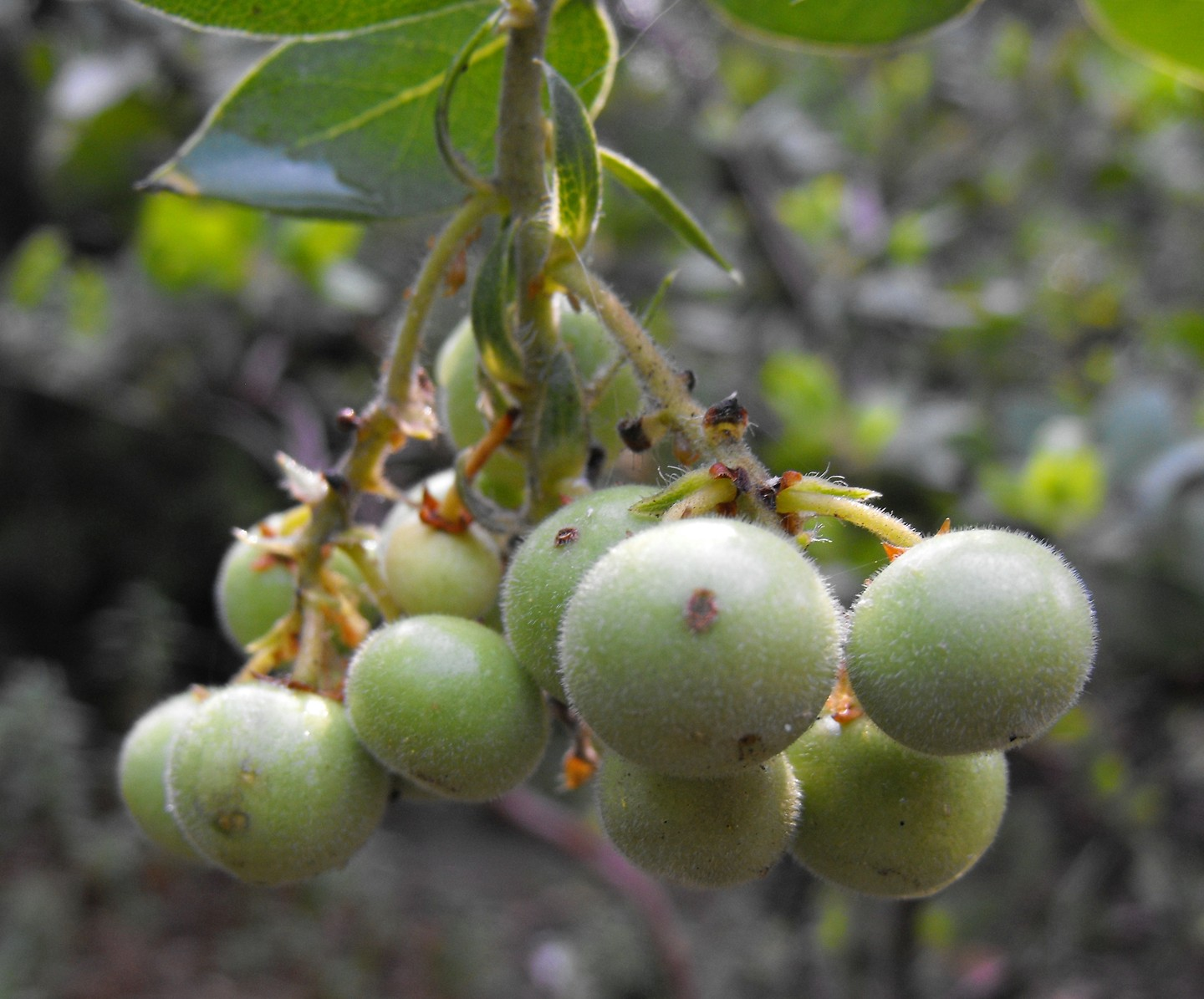
Arctostaphylos catalinae fruit

Arctostaphylos catalinae, known by the common name Santa Catalina Island manzanita, is a species of manzanita native to Southern California. The evergreen shrub is found growing naturally only on Catalina and Santa Cruz Islands on the coast ridges. It thrives in maritime chaparral and can be used in coastal gardens.

== Distribution and habitat ==
The plant is endemic to Santa Catalina Island, one of the southern Channel Islands of California.

The plant grows in maritime chaparral habitats, on the ridges of Catalina Island at elevations from 1150 to 1500 ft (350 to 460 m).

== Description ==
Arctostaphylos catalinae is a shrub usually exceeding 2 metres (6.6 ft) in height, sometimes taking a treelike form up to 5 metres (16 ft) tall. It is glandular and covered in white bristles.

The leaves also have fine bristles. The dull, light green blades are up to 5 centimeters long by 3 wide.

The bloom period is from February to April with white, pink flowers. The flowers are borne in an open, branching inflorescence with leaflike bracts.

The fruit is a spherical drupe up to 1.5 centimeters wide.

== Ecology ==
Arctostaphylos catalinae beneficials include hummingbirds (nectar) and insects.

A primary threat to Arctostaphylos catalinae included feral goats. The goats were removed in 2001 and since then the plant has been actively recovering.

Unlike other manzanita species, this one lacks a basal burl. Without the ability to sprout from a basal burl after a fire, it uses seed germination for regeneration.

== Cultivation and uses ==
The Santa Catalina Island manzanita can be used as an ornamental shrub in gardens. It requires full sun, very low water, and is adaptable to different soil conditions.

== See also ==
- California chaparral and woodlands — ecoregion.
  - California coastal sage and chaparral — sub-ecoregion.
